= Extromatica Network Monitor =

Network monitoring software

- Extromatica Network Monitor 5.1.1251 running under Windows XP
- Developer(s): Extromatica
- Stable release: 5.1.1251 / May 26, 2010; 15 years ago
- Written in: C++
- Operating system: Windows
- Platform: x86
- Available in: English
- Type: Network management system
- License: Shareware
- Website: www.extromatica.com

Extromatica Network Monitor is a network monitoring application created and maintained by Extromatica company. It is designed to monitor network hardware, servers and network services for faults and performance degradation. It alerts users when things go wrong and again when they get better. The software supports a variety of real-time notification mechanisms, including Short Message Service (SMS).

== History ==
The development of this software began in 1999 as an internal project by Maxim Perenesenko and Yuri Zaitsev. After 2 years of development, it was released as Network Eagle Monitor. It took one more year until first stable release in 2002.

As of 2015, this software is maintained by Extromatica company and is named Extromatica Network Monitor.

== Overview ==
=== Tests ===
- Tests IP channel between monitoring system and another computer or network device with Internet Control Message Protocol (ICMP) protocol.
- Checks accessibility of TCP based services like Simple Mail Transfer Protocol (SMTP), Post Office Protocol (POP3), Hypertext Transfer Protocol (HTTP), Network News Transfer Protocol (NNTP), File Transfer Protocol (FTP), Secure Shell (SSH), and so on.
- Checks availability and responsiveness of File Transfer Protocol (FTP) servers.
- Checks availability and responsiveness of Hypertext Transfer Protocol (HTTP) and HTTPS servers.
- Checks content of Web page by searching for specified substring.
- Monitors free and used space on disk or network shares.
- Tests local or remote (network share (Windows share)) directory for changes.
- Periodically runs external commands or batch scripts and checks the return code.
- Tests accessibility of data sources of Open Database Connectivity (ODBC) or native MS SQL. Runs SQL queries and checks return results as an option.
- Executes script tests. They can be written in Visual Basic Script, JavaScript or other languages supported by the operating system (Active Scripting). For example: Active Python, ActivePerl.
- Monitors a process on local or remote machines by its process identifier or name.
- Monitors local or remote Windows Event Log for specified messages.
- Communicates with a Windows machine to determine if a specified Windows Service is running and responding.
- Monitors the content of specified file for changes by calculating MD5 hash or searching for substring; this check can test files inside archives.
- Monitors status of local or network printers; can track more than twenty events, such as paper out or jammed, toner out, many more.
- Tests Remote Access Service connection.
- Monitors various parameters of Simple Network Management Protocol (SNMP) enabled computer or device.
- Tests Lightweight Directory Access Protocol (LDAP) server accessibility, checks LDAP directory content.
- System performance - monitors loads of central processor unit (CPU), random access memory (RAM), local or remote computers.

=== Alerts and actions ===
- Displays a popup-window with information about events.
- Executes external program.
- Plays a sound file.
- Sends an e-mail message with information about events.
- Writes event to Syslog.
- Sends user-defined message to the Windows Event Log.
- Executes script alerts. Alerts can be written in Visual Basic Script, JavaScript or other languages supported by the operating system (Active Scripting).
- Rebootss local or remote computer.
- Changes running state of Windows service, local or remote.
- Running user-defined SQL query.
- Sends SMS messages.

== See also ==
- Network administration
- Network management
- Comparison of network monitoring systems
