= Visual Basic (classic) =

Microsoft's programming language based on BASIC and COM

- Visual Basic 6.0 IDE running on Windows XP
- Paradigm: Object-based and event-driven
- Developer: Microsoft
- First appeared: May 1991; 35 years ago
- Final release: 6.0 / 1998; 28 years ago
- Typing discipline: Static, strong
- OS: Microsoft Windows and MS-DOS
- Filename extensions: .cls, .frm, .frx, .ctl, .ctx, .vbp, .vbg, .bas
- Website: learn.microsoft.com/en-us/previous-versions/visualstudio/visual-basic-6/visual-basic-6.0-documentation

Major implementations
- Microsoft Visual Studio

Influenced by
- BASIC, Microsoft BASIC, QBasic

Influenced
- Visual Basic .NET, Visual Basic for Applications, Windows Forms, Gambas, Xojo, Basic4ppc, Basic4android, and NS Basic

Visual Basic (VB), sometimes referred to as Classic Visual Basic or as VB6, is a third-generation programming language based on BASIC, as well as an associated integrated development environment (IDE). Visual Basic was developed by Microsoft for Windows, and is known for supporting rapid application development (RAD) of graphical user interface (GUI) applications, event-driven programming, and both consumption and development of components via the Component Object Model (COM) technology.

VB was first released in 1991. The final release was version 6 (VB6) in 1998. On April 8, 2008, Microsoft stopped supporting the VB6 IDE, relegating it to legacy status. The Microsoft VB team still maintains compatibility for VB6 applications through its "It Just Works" program on supported Windows operating systems.

Visual Basic .NET (VB.NET) is based on Classic Visual Basic. Because VB.NET was later rebranded back to Visual Basic, the name is ambiguous: it can refer to either Classic Visual Basic or to the .NET version.

Just as BASIC was originally intended to be easy to learn, Microsoft intended the same for VB.

Development of a VB application is exclusively supported via the VB integrated development environment (IDE), an application in the contemporary Visual Studio suite of tools. Unlike modern versions of Visual Studio, which support many languages including VB (.NET), the VB IDE only supports VB.

In 2014, some software developers still preferred Visual Basic 6.0 over its successor, Visual Basic .NET. Visual Basic 6.0 was selected as the most dreaded programming language by respondents of Stack Overflow's annual developer survey in 2016, 2017, and 2018.

== Overview ==
As was the intention of older BASIC variants, VB was intended to have a low learning curve. Further, the IDE was intended to promote productivity; even for complex GUI applications. Programming involves visually arranging components or controls on a form, specifying attributes and actions for those components, and writing code that directs behavior. Since components have default attributes and actions, a programmer can develop a simple program without writing much code.

Programs built with earlier versions suffered performance problems, but faster computers and native code compilation made this less of an issue.

Since a VB program is compiled as a native code executable instead of interpreted as old BASIC variants, it runs relatively fast and requires relatively little storage space. But, from version 5 on, it requires relatively large library files to be loaded at runtime; about 1 MB. Core runtime libraries are included by default in Windows 2000 and later, but extended runtime components require extra installation consideration. Earlier versions of Microsoft Windows (95/98/NT), require the runtime libraries to be distributed with the executable.

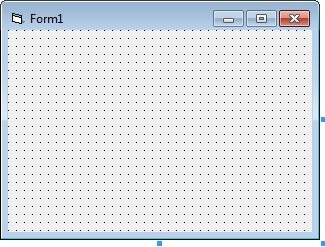
An empty form in Visual Basic 6

Forms are created using drag-and-drop techniques. A tool is used to place controls (e.g., text boxes, buttons, etc.) on the form (window). Controls have attributes and event handlers associated with them. Default values are provided when the control is created, but may be changed by the programmer. Many attribute values can be modified during run time based on user actions or changes in the environment, providing a dynamic application. For example, code can be inserted into the form resize event handler to reposition a control so that it remains centered on the form, expands to fill up the form, etc. By inserting code into the event handler for a keypress in a text box, the program can automatically translate the case of the text being entered, or even prevent certain characters from being inserted.

Development in the IDE is organized as a project which can be configured to output as a program (EXE), a dynamic-link library (DLL) or an ActiveX control library (OCX) which is a specialized DLL.

Controls provide the graphical functionality of a GUI application, and programmers attach code to event handlers to perform actions. For example, a drop-down control displays a list of items. When the user selects an item, an event handler is automatically called that executes the code that the programmer attached to the handler.

For a DLL, the VB code generally provides no user interface, and instead provides COM objects to other programs. This allows for capabilities such as server-side processing or an add-in module.

Via the COM technology, unused memory is recovered for reuse using reference counting; recovering when the count reaches zero. VB reduces the count when a variable goes out of scope or when assigned to Nothing. This design prevents memory leaks that plague some older languages such as C & C++. It differs from the more modern types of garbage collection.

VB provides a large library of utility objects, and it provides basic support for object-oriented programming.

Unlike many other programming languages, VB code is not case-sensitive – though the IDE transforms keywords into a standard case and variable names to match the case used elsewhere in the project. Of note, string comparison is case sensitive by default.

The VB compiler is shared with other Visual Studio suite languages, C and C++. Nevertheless, by default the restrictions in the IDE do not allow creation of some targets (Windows model DLLs) and threading models, but over the years, developers have bypassed these restrictions.

== Features ==
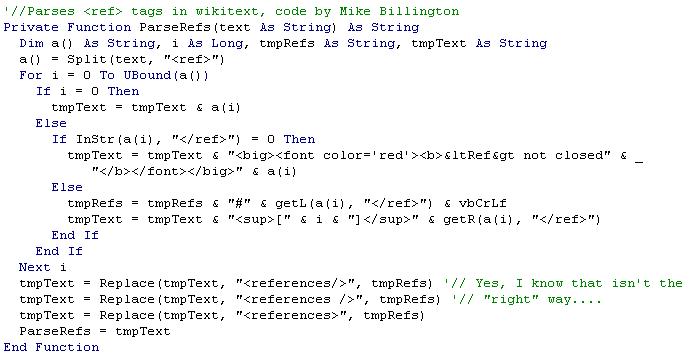
A function using the If, Then, Else and Dim statements

Visual Basic has notable features and characteristics that are in some cases different than other BASIC variants or from other common languages:

- Enables rapid application development (RAD) of graphical user interface (GUI) applications, access to databases using Jet Data Access Objects, Remote Data Objects, or ActiveX Data Object (ADO), and creation of ActiveX controls and COM objects.
- Supports event-driven programming
- Allows use of the Windows API via an external function declaration technology
- Supports sharing and reuse via the COM component technology. A programmer can create an application using components provided by VB, developed internally or from third parties. Over time the development community produced and shared many components.
- Unlike older BASIC variants, instead of requiring line numbers to support branching, code is grouped into named blocks delimited by Sub...End Sub or Function...End Function. VB retains line number support
- Code statements have no terminating character other than a line ending (carriage return/line feed), and versions since 3 allow for multi-line statements for concatenation of strings or explicitly using the underscore character (_) at the end of a line
- A code comment is denoted by a single apostrophe (') character, like: ' This is a comment
- Looping statement blocks begin and end with keywords: Do...Loop, While...End While, For...Next
- Chained variable assignment is not allowed; for example A = B = C does not result in the values of A, B and C being equal. The Boolean result of "is B equal to C?" is stored in A
- Like other BASIC variants, but unlike many other languages that use 1, Boolean True has numeric value −1. VB stores a Boolean as a two's complement signed integer with all ones in binary for true and zero for false. This is apparent when performing a (bitwise) Not operation on the two's complement value 0, which returns the two's complement value −1, in other words True = Not False. This inherent functionality becomes especially useful when performing logical operations on the individual bits of an integer such as And, Or, Xor and Not. This definition of True is also consistent with BASIC since the early 1970s Microsoft BASIC implementation and is also related to the characteristics of CPU instructions at the time.
- Logical and bitwise operators are unified. This is unlike some C-derived languages (such as Perl), which have separate logical and bitwise operators. This is a traditional feature of BASIC.
- Unlike for many languages which use zero for the lower bound of an array, VB allows the lower bound to be any value – like in Pascal and Fortran. The Option Base statement can be used to set the default lower bound, but some claim that its use leads to confusion when reading code and is best avoided by always explicitly specifying the lower bound. This uncommon language trait does exist in Visual Basic .NET but not in VBScript.
  OPTION BASE was introduced by ANSI, with the standard for ANSI Minimal BASIC in the late 1970s.
- Tightly bound to the Windows operating system and the Component Object Model. The native types for strings and arrays are the dedicated COM types, BSTR and SAFEARRAY.
- Banker's rounding as the default behavior when converting real numbers to integers with the Round function. ? Round(2.5, 0) gives 2, ? Round(3.5, 0) gives 4.
- An integer type value is automatically promoted to a floating point type in expressions that involve the normal division operator (/) so that division of one integer by another produces a result that may seem more intuitive from a mathematical perspective. VB provides an integer divide operator (\) that does truncate.
- By default, if a variable has not been declared or if no type declaration character is specified, it acts like a variant. However this can be changed with Deftype statements such as DefInt, DefBool, DefVar, DefObj, DefStr. There are 12 Deftype statements in total offered by Visual Basic 6.0. The default type may be overridden for a specific declaration by using a special suffix character on the variable name (# for Double, ! for Single, & for Long, % for Integer, $ for String, and @ for Currency) or using the key phrase As (type). VB can be set up to require variable declarations via Option Explicit.

== History ==
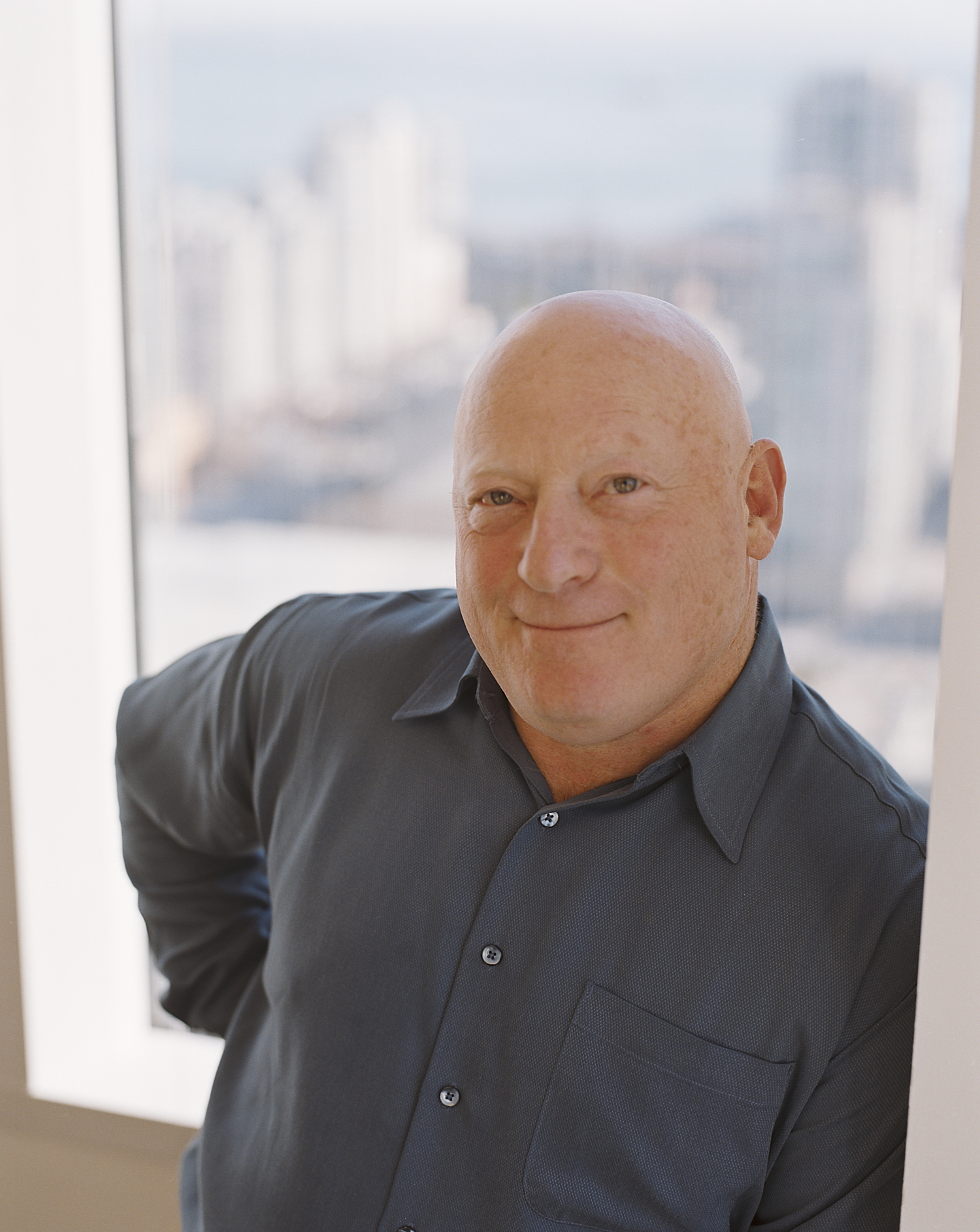
Alan Cooper created the drag-and-drop design for the user interface of Visual Basic.

BYTE reported in 1989 that, based on its experience with Macintosh software development, Microsoft "wants to provide a development environment that mimics the delivery environment". BASIC's string handling was preferable to C, the company's Greg Lobdell said, when developing the mostly transaction-processing applications Microsoft expected object-oriented programming tools to create.

Visual Basic 1.0 was introduced in 1991. The drag and drop design for creating the user interface is derived from a prototype form generator developed by Alan Cooper and his company called Tripod. Microsoft contracted with Cooper and his associates to develop Tripod into a programmable form system for Windows 3.0, under the code name Ruby (no relation to the later Ruby programming language). Tripod did not include a programming language at all.

Microsoft decided to combine Ruby with the Basic language to create Visual Basic. The Ruby interface generator provided the "visual" part of Visual Basic, and this was combined with the "EB" Embedded BASIC engine designed for Microsoft's abandoned "Omega" database system. Ruby also provided the ability to load dynamic link libraries containing additional controls (then called "gizmos"), which later became the VBX interface.

=== Timeline ===
Visual Basic for MS-DOS

VB DOS icon

- Project 'basic Thunder' was initiated in 1990. Thunder persisted through to the last release of Visual Basic in the name of the primary internal function, "ThunderRTMain".
- Visual Basic 1.0 (May 1991) was released for Windows at the Comdex/Windows World trade show in Atlanta, Georgia.
- Visual Basic 1.0 for DOS was released in September 1992. The language itself was not quite compatible with Visual Basic for Windows, as it was the next version of Microsoft's DOS-based BASIC compilers, QuickBASIC and BASIC Professional Development System. The interface used a text-based user interface, using extended ASCII characters to simulate the appearance of a GUI.
- Visual Basic 2.0 was released in November 1992. The programming environment was easier to use, and its speed was improved. Notably, forms became instantiable objects, thus laying the foundational concepts of class modules as were later offered in VB4.
- Visual Basic 3.0 was released in the summer of 1993 and came in Standard and Professional versions. VB3 included version 1.1 of the Jet Database Engine that could read and write Jet (or Access) 1.x databases.
- Visual Basic 4.0 (August 1995) was the first version that could create 32-bit as well as 16-bit Windows programs. It has three editions; Standard, Professional, and Enterprise. It also introduced the ability to write non-GUI classes in Visual Basic. With VB4 the language was separated from the GUI library, and made available as VBA, in which form it was embedded with the Office 95 suite. To ease migration of Office macros and scripts, features from WordBasic, Excel Basic and Access Basic were incorporated into the language. Incompatibilities between different releases of VB4 caused installation and operation problems. While previous versions of Visual Basic had used VBX controls, Visual Basic now used OLE controls (with files names ending in .OCX) instead. These were later to be named ActiveX controls.
- With version 5.0 (February 1997), Microsoft released Visual Basic exclusively for 32-bit versions of Windows. Programmers who preferred to write 16-bit programs were able to import programs written in Visual Basic 4.0 to Visual Basic 5.0, and Visual Basic 5.0 programs can easily be converted to Visual Basic 4.0. Visual Basic 5.0 also introduced the ability to create custom user controls, as well as the ability to compile to native Windows executable code, speeding up calculation-intensive code execution. A free, downloadable Control Creation Edition was also released for creation of ActiveX controls. It was also used as an introductory form of Visual Basic: a regular .exe project could be created and run in the IDE, but not compiled.
- Visual Basic 6.0 (Mid-1998) improved in a number of areas including the ability to create web-based applications.
- Mainstream Support for Microsoft Visual Basic 6.0 ended on March 31, 2005, and Extended support ended in March 2008. However, primary components of the Visual Basic 6 runtime environment run in all versions of Windows up to and including Windows 11.

== Learning ==
Classic Visual Basic was released before the commercial Internet, so learning VB programming skills involved using digital help resources shipped with the product, attending user group meetings, and buying books and magazines. A range of book publishers supplied materials for new and experienced VB programmers, including Microsoft Press, IDG Books, Howard W. Sams, O’Reilly, Osborne McGraw-Hill, Que, Sybex, Ventana Press, Wiley, Wrox, and Ziff Davis Press.

When Visual Basic 1.0 was released, just a few commercial books were available, but publishers caught up with demand by Visual Basic 3.0 (1993), a release designed to coincide with Windows 3.1.

Popular VB programming books included:

- John Clark Craig's Microsoft Visual Basic Programmer’s Workshop (1991), a book-and-software toolkit for Visual Basic 1.0 programmers.
- Ross Nelson’s Running Visual Basic for Windows (1992), one of the first introductory primers for new programmers, released for Visual Basic 2.0 and updated for Visual Basic 3.0.
- Michael J. Young's Visual Basic—Game Programming for Windows (1992), an early game programming book for Windows that featured ready-to-run strategy games and fractals.
- Michael Halvorson's Microsoft Visual Basic 4 Step by Step (1995), a book that introduced Visual Basic 4.0 programming by focusing on the new Windows 95 user interface and topics like event-driven programming, managing data, using toolbox controls, processing text, and debugging.
- Bruce McKinney’s Hardcore Visual Basic: Secrets, Shortcuts, and Solutions for Programming Windows without Using C (1995), a text for advanced VB users that taught Windows programming techniques usually implemented in Microsoft C.
- Dan Appleman’s Visual Basic 5.0 Programmer’s Guide to the Win32 API (1997), which included information from the Windows SDK about using the features of Windows 95 and Windows NT 4.0.
- John Connell's Beginning Visual Basic 6 Database Programming (1998), written for VB programmers who needed to access information in corporate databases, a topic of major interest in the late 1990s and 2000s.

== Derivative technologies ==
Microsoft developed many derivatives of VB (classic), including:

- Visual Basic .NET is Microsoft's successor to Visual Basic 6.0, and part of Microsoft's .NET ecosystem (which over time has sometimes been called framework and core). It is not backwards compatible with Visual Basic 6.0. An automated conversion tool exists, but fully automated conversion for most projects is not possible.
- Visual Basic for Applications (VBA) is a scripting language embedded in many Microsoft applications such as Microsoft Office, and third-party products like SolidWorks, AutoCAD, WordPerfect Office 2002, ArcGIS, Sage 300 ERP, and Business Objects Desktop Intelligence. There are small inconsistencies in the way VBA is implemented in different applications, but it is largely the same language as Visual Basic 6.0 and uses the same runtime library. Visual Basic development ended with 6.0, but in 2010 Microsoft introduced VBA 7 to provide extended features and add 64-bit support.
- VBScript is the default language for Active Server Pages. It can be used in Windows scripting and client-side web page scripting. It resembles VB in syntax, but is a separate language—executed by vbscript.dll instead of the VB runtime. ASP and VBScript should not be confused with ASP.NET, which uses the .NET Framework for compiled web pages.
- OpenOffice Basic is a Visual Basic compatible interpreter that originated in StarOffice office suite.
- Gambas is a Visual Basic inspired free software programming language for the Linux operating system. It is not a clone of Visual Basic, but it does have the ability to convert Visual Basic programs to Gambas.
- LotusScript is a VBA variant available in Lotus SmartSuite and Lotus Notes.
- Later versions of Corel WordPerfect Office implement access to VBA as one of the macro/scripting languages, the other major ones being CorelScript and PerfectScript.
- Earlier versions of Microsoft Word use a variant of VB called WordBasic.

== Issues ==
=== Performance ===
Versions before 5 compiled the code to P-Code – which is interpreted at runtime. The benefits of P-Code include portability and smaller binary file sizes, but it usually slows execution, since an interpreter adds a layer to the execution environment. VB applications require the Microsoft VB runtime MSVBVM##.DLL, where ## is a version number, either 50 or 60. MSVBVM60.dll comes standard with Windows in all editions from Windows 98 to Windows 11 although some editions of Windows 7 do not include it. For Windows 95 however the application installation process requires the DLL needed by the program. VB 5 and 6 can compile code to either native or P-Code but the runtime is still required for built-in functions and forms management.

=== Other ===
Criticisms of VB (prior to VB.NET) include:

- versioning problems associated with DLLs, known as "DLL hell"
- poor support for object-oriented programming
- can only create multi-threaded applications using ActiveX or DLL
- variant types having a greater performance and storage overhead than strongly-typed programming languages
- dependency on complex and fragile COM registry entries

== Legacy development and support ==
All versions of the Visual Basic IDE, from 1.0 to 6.0, are no longer supported by Microsoft. The associated runtime environments are also unsupported, except for the Visual Basic 6 core runtime environment, which Microsoft officially supports for the lifetime of Windows 10 and Windows 11. Third party components that shipped with Visual Studio 6.0 are not included in this support statement. Some legacy Visual Basic components may still work on newer platforms, despite being unsupported by Microsoft and other vendors. Documentation for Visual Basic 6.0, its application programming interface and tools is best covered in the last MSDN release before Visual Studio.NET 2002. Later releases of MSDN focused on .NET development and had significant parts of the Visual Basic 6.0 programming documentation removed as the language evolved, and support for older code ended. Although vendor support for Visual Basic 6 has ended, and the product has never been supported on the latest versions of Windows, key parts of the environment still work on newer platforms. It is possible to get a subset of the development environment working on 32-bit and 64-bit versions of Windows Vista, Windows 7, Windows 8, Windows 10 and Windows 11. Owing to its persistent remaining popularity, third-party attempts to further support it, such as Rubberduck, exist.

== Example code ==
The following code snippet displays a message box saying "Hello, World!" as the window loads:

Private Sub Form_Load()
    ' Execute a simple message box that says "Hello, World!"
    MsgBox "Hello, World!"
End Sub

This snippet makes a counter that moves up 1 every second (a label and a timer control need to be added to the form for this to work) until the form is closed or an integer overflow occurs:

Option Explicit
Dim Count As Integer
Private Sub Form_Load()
    Count = 0
    Timer1.Interval = 1000 ' units of milliseconds
End Sub
Private Sub Timer1_Timer()
    Count = Count + 1
    Label1.Caption = Count
End Sub

== See also ==
- IIf – a function in several editions of Visual Basic roughly equivalent to the ?: conditional operator of C and related languages.
- Comparison of programming languages
- Control array
