= Visual Studio Tools for Office =

Development tools for Microsoft Office

Visual Studio Tools for Office (VSTO) is a set of development tools available in the form of a Visual Studio add-in (project templates) and a runtime that allows Microsoft Office 2003 and later versions of Office applications to host the .NET Framework Common Language Runtime (CLR) to expose their functionality via .NET.

This allows extensions to the Office applications to be written in CLI compliant languages as well as to use functionality and user interface constructs from Office applications in .NET applications. Extensions to Office prior to Office 2003 only allowed the creation of COM add-ins using Visual Basic or Visual C++ and a "Developer" edition was also offered that enabled VBA developers to create COM Add-ins.

VSTO supersedes developer editions of Office 2000 and Office XP for Office development. The developer editions of Office have been discontinued after Office XP and VSTO is available for Office 2003 and later versions only. The VSTO runtime, although part of VSTO development tools, is also downloadable separately if required. COM addin development is still possible for Office 2000 and all later versions using the Shared Add-in template in any version of Microsoft Visual Studio.

The VSTO add-ins (project types and controls) are also developed using Visual Studio. For Visual Studio .NET 2003 and Visual Studio 2005, it was available only as a standalone edition with support for .NET languages limited to Visual Basic.NET and C#. It was also included as a part of the Visual Studio Team System 2005.

Later on, the Visual Studio Tools for Office 2005 Second Edition (VSTO 2005 SE) was released as a free add-in to Visual Studio Professional and above that includes Office 2007 and 2003 support. However, for Visual Studio Professional Edition, it installs only the application-level add-ins; it does not add the document-level customizations or other functionality (actions pane, host controls, visual document designer, etc.) available in the full version of VSTO or Team System editions.

The current version is Visual Studio Tools for Office 2012 (VSTO 4.5) which is compatible with Office 2016, Office 2013, Office 2010, and Office 2007.

== Comparison with VBA ==
Like VBA, code written for VSTO is executed by a separate virtual machine (the CLR) which is hosted inside the Microsoft Office applications. However, unlike VBA, where the code is stored in the document file itself, programs written with VSTO are stored in separate CLI assemblies which are associated with the documents by means of custom properties.

If the properties are present, Microsoft Office hosts the CLR and loads the assembly specified in the property into a separate appdomain named after the document's name. VSTO applications are subject to the .NET Framework Code Access Security constraints, in addition to the digital signature based permission model that governs VBA macros.

VSTO development is normally performed using Visual Studio as used by professional programmers. The Office application is (re)started for each debugging session. VBA is normally developed from within the Office application and requires no special tools. VBA also has a macro recorder that can generate VBA code from user actions which is useful for non-professional programmers.

== Comparison with JavaScript API ==
Office extensions or add-ins can be developed using VSTO and JavaScript API technologies. VSTO is Microsoft .NET technology and add-ins using JavaScript API technology use JavaScript, HTML and CSS.

JavaScript API add-ins are highly portable across platforms like iOS, mobile phones, tablets and Windows. The complete licensing process and cycle is easy and maintained within add-ins. Interactive visualization is feasible in JavaScript API add-ins using Charts, ClipArt and Maps.

JavaScript API add-in development is comparatively new technology and is introduced with Office 2016. There are limited APIs and functions available and supported.

VSTO has complete access to all Office object models. It is feasible to perform all operations on the Office client. Features that requires accessing local machine file systems and other applications are feasible and easy in VSTO. C# or any other CLI programming language can be used to create new Office add-ins.

== VSTO compatibility and add-in functionality ==
The latest version of VSTO, as of 2018, is "Office Tools for Visual Studio" and is available with all versions of Microsoft Visual Studio 2017.

VSTO 2003, 2005, 3.0 and 2010 runtimes install in side-by-side (SxS) mode. VSTO 2005 SE runtime replaces the earlier VSTO 2005 runtime. VSTO 2010 runtime installs side-by-side with VSTO 3.0, however, Office 2007 applications can also use the VSTO 2010 runtime. All older VSTO solutions will continue to run in newer versions of Office as long as the runtime against which they were developed is installed.

VSTO solutions developed against newer Office versions will not work in older Office versions as they lack the necessary Primary Interop Assemblies (PIAs) Office 2010 applications will always use VSTO 2010 Runtime. Design-time support is as follows:

VSTO runtime version	Develop/Build against Office 2003		Develop/Build against Office 2007		Develop/Build against Office 2010		.NET version	Available as
VSTO runtime version	Document-level	Application-level	Document-level	Application-level	Document-level	Application-level	.NET version	Available as
VSTO 2003	Word, Excel	—	—	—	—	—	.NET 1.1	Available only as Visual Studio .NET 2003 VSTO SKU
VSTO 2005	Word, Excel	Outlook	—	—	—	—	.NET 2.0, 3.0 or 3.5	Available as Visual Studio 2005 VSTO SKU and part of Visual Studio 2005 Team System editions
VSTO 2005 SE	Requires VSTO 2005 for document-level customizations	Word, Excel, Outlook, PowerPoint, Visio	InfoPath	Word, Excel, Outlook, PowerPoint, Visio, InfoPath	—	—	.NET 2.0, 3.0 or 3.5	Downloadable for Visual Studio 2005 Professional and above, however document-level customizations require original VSTO 2005 (Standalone SKU or Team System editions)
VSTO 3.0	Word, Excel (Builds against the VSTO 2005/2005 SE runtime)	Word, Excel, Outlook, PowerPoint, Visio, Project (Builds against the VSTO 2005 SE runtime)	Word, Excel, InfoPath	Word, Excel, Outlook, PowerPoint, Visio, InfoPath, Project, SharePoint 2007 Workflows	—	—	.NET 3.5	Built into Visual Studio 2008 Professional and above
VSTO 4.0	—	—	Word, Excel	Word, Excel, Outlook, PowerPoint, Visio, InfoPath, Project	Word, Excel	Word, Excel, Outlook, PowerPoint, Visio, InfoPath, Project	.NET 3.5 or 4.0	Built into all versions of Visual Studio 2017

Code developed with various editions of VSTO will only work with certain releases and editions of Microsoft Office 2003 and related products. Specifically, VSTO solutions developed in editions prior to VSTO 2005 SE will not work with any edition of Office 2003 other than Professional. VSTO solutions developed with VSTO 2005 SE will work with Office 2003 Standard (only application-level add-ins) and Professional. VSTO 2005 SE solutions will work with all editions of Office 2007.

== See also ==
- Microsoft Visual Studio
- Visual Studio Tools for Applications (VSTA)
