= JScript .NET =

Programming language developed by Microsoft

- Paradigms: Multi-paradigm: object-oriented (prototype-based), functional, imperative, scripting
- Family: ECMAScript
- Developer: Microsoft Corporation
- Typing discipline: duck, weak, dynamic
- Scope: lexical
- Platform: .NET framework
- OS: Microsoft Windows
- License: proprietary
- Filename extensions: .js
- File formats: JScript .NET

Influenced by
- JavaScript, JScript, ECMAScript

JScript .NET is a .NET framework programming language developed by Microsoft as proprietary software.

The main differences between JScript and JScript .NET can be summarized as:

Firstly, JScript is a scripting language, and as such, programs (or more suggestively, scripts) can be executed with no need to compile the code before. This is not the case with the JScript .NET command-line interface compiler, since this next-generation version relies on the .NET Common Language Runtime (CLR) for execution, which requires that the code be compiled to Common Intermediate Language (CIL), formerly named Microsoft Intermediate Language (MSIL), code before it can be run. Nevertheless, JScript .NET still fully supports interpreting source code at runtime (e.g., via the Function constructor or the eval function) and indeed the interpreter can be exposed by custom applications hosting the JScript .NET engine via the VSA interfaces.

Secondly, JScript has a strong foundation in Microsoft's ActiveX and Component Object Model (COM) technologies, and relies mainly on ActiveX components to provide much of its function (including database access via ActiveX Data Objects (ADO), file handling, etc.), whereas JScript .NET uses the .NET framework to provide equivalent function. For backward-compatibility (or for where no .NET equivalent library exists), JScript .NET still provides full access to ActiveX objects via .NET and COM Interop using both the ActiveXObject constructor and the standard methods of the .NET Type class.

Although the .NET framework and languages such as C# and Visual Basic (.NET) have been adopted widely, JScript .NET has received little attention, from the media and developers. It is not supported in Microsoft's premier development tool, Visual Studio .NET. However, ASP.NET supports JScript .NET.

== Language differences ==
The following are prime examples of language differences between JScript .NET and other .NET languages, including comparisons.

=== Differences with C# ===
- JScript .NET does not require an entry point (main() function) that an operating system must call directly when executing a JScript .NET application, as such, JScript .NET program control flow can be based on global code.
- JScript .NET, because of its very loose data type checking system, can be easier to learn, since the common convention of declaring types explicitly is unneeded.
- JScript .NET does not require explicit references to the .NET framework Base Class Library, as certain functions found in earlier versions of JScript are present in JScript .NET (e.g., functions for finding the tangent of an angle for a right triangle).
- JScript .NET is closely linked to C syntax, and is thus easy to learn for C#, Java, or C++ developers.
- While JScript .NET can be used to create Windows Forms applications, it can have some trouble, as delegates can only be consumed in JScript .NET and not created. Thus, custom events are hard to emulate in JScript .NET.

=== Differences with C++ ===
- JScript .NET does not need a main() function.
- JScript .NET does not need explicit type declaration on variables. (In C++, the use of templates and generics can be compared to this, loosely emulated with template specialization, etc.)
- JScript .NET does not need explicit type casts on variable use in the program. Code used to retrieve a string of characters, but only used for integer numbers can be cast implicitly; the vice versa can be done without error at compile time, but there is a chance of loss of precision or data.

e.g.:

import System;

Console.WriteLine("Hello, what's your name?");
Console.WriteLine("Type your name: ");

var name: String = Console.ReadLine();

Console.WriteLine($"Hello, {name}");

=== Differences with Java ===
- JScript .NET syntax and lexical conventions are similar to Java in that both are derived from C. JScript was originally Microsoft's implementation of ECMAScript, which is more commonly known as JavaScript, though it is unrelated to Java. Thus, users of Java and other C-derived languages will find JScript easier to learn.
- JScript .NET allows developers to use untyped variables, and can sometimes infer their type from their usage to optimize the compiled code. On the other hand, Java requires all variables to be typed, though Java also supports type inference.
- JScript .NET can add properties and methods to objects in run-time, while Java objects always conform to their declared interface.
- JScript .NET supports global variables, which Java does not.

=== Differences with older versions of JScript ===
- JScript .NET allows declaring variables and functions with type information (e.g., var x: String;), while type information for JScript's variables and functions cannot be declared (e.g., var x;).
- JScript .NET scripts are not interpreted, but executed independently. When executed, a JScript .NET application will invoke the CLR. The CLR will execute the CIL instructions without using an interpreter.
- JScript .NET can be run without the presence of a browser or another scripting engine as the compiler can generate standalone executables and assemblies. However these still require .NET framework to be installed to run.
- JScript .NET provides access to the .NET framework Base Class Library (BCL), providing much more function.
- JScript .NET is available as a scripting language for only ASP.NET, the technology used to generate web pages. Thus, JScript .NET has a role similar to PHP and other server-side scripting languages. Internet Explorer, however, still uses only the older JScript engine, so JScript.NET cannot be used to script web pages (or HTML Applications (HTAs), or HTCs). In this regard, JScript is much more versatile than JScript .NET.

== See also ==
- JS++
- TypeScript
- JavaScript OSA – system-level scripting language for Apple Macintosh
- JScript
- ActionScript
- C#
