= Microsoft Script Debugger =

Microsoft Script Debugger is relatively minimal debugger for Windows Script Host-supported scripting languages, such as VBScript and JScript. Its user interface allows the user to set breakpoints and/or step through execution of script code line by line, and examine values of variables and properties after any step. In effect, it provides a way for developers to see script code behavior as it runs, thus eliminating much of the guess-work when things do not quite work as intended.

Microsoft considers it to be deprecated. Also, Internet Explorer 8 comes with a different, tightly integrated JScript debugger part of the Internet Explorer Developer Tools.

== Features ==
According to Microsoft, the Script Debugger provides these traditional debugging features:

- Ability to set and clear breakpoints.
- Ability to step through and over procedures.
- Ability to display and change the values of variables and properties.
- Ability to evaluate expressions.
- Ability to view the call stack, and navigate to any currently loaded procedure.

Additionally, it can open and edit HTML pages, and it supports script colorization for improved readability.

== Limitations ==
The debugger has several limitations, including the following:

- The line indicator may be incorrect when stepping through inline JScript or debugging a framed document.
- When debugging documents open in Internet Explorer, only one can be debugged at a time.
- Commands typed in the Command window have no effect unless the user is in break mode.
- A breakpoint immediately after a Document.Write is ignored.
- Entering a Document.Write command while debugging, or refreshing a document in Internet Explorer while debugging it, can cause hangs or other unexpected behavior.
- Unlike in other debuggers, there is no Watch window for monitoring variables; they must be checked via manual commands.
- Unlike in other debuggers, breakpoints can't be set by clicking in the left margin; they must be set via keypress or menu.

== Usage ==
After installation, new options can be found in Internet Explorer's Script Debugger menu, which gets added in the View menu. Debugging can optionally be turned off from the Advanced tab in the Internet Options dialog.

== See also ==
- Microsoft Script Editor
- Internet Explorer Developer Tools
