= CountrySTAT =

Information technology system for food and information

Logo of CountrySTAT

CountrySTAT is a Web-based information technology system for food and agriculture statistics at the national and subnational levels. It provides decision-makers access to statistics across thematic areas such as production, prices, trade and consumption. This supports analysis, informed policy-making and monitoring with the goal of eradicating extreme poverty and hunger.

Since 2005, the Statistics Division of the United Nations Food and Agriculture Organization (FAO) has introduced CountrySTAT in over 20 countries in Latin America, sub-Saharan Africa and Asia.

== Overview ==
The CountrySTAT web system is a browser oriented statistical framework to organise, harmonise and synchronise data collections. CountrySTAT aims are to facilitate data use by policy makers and researchers. It provides statistical standards, data exchange tools and related methods without using external data sources such as databases. The data source is a text file in a specific format, called px-file. The application supports many languages. The layout can be easily changed to match the needs of users.

== Features ==
The CountrySTAT web system is easy to install and to operate on a standard Windows XP professional machine. It is programmed in ASP with visual basic using internet information service and suitable windows software for graphical and statistical output for the intranet and internet environment.

== Criticisms ==
The programming with VB scripts, customised DLLs and additional windows software (PC-Axis family) makes it to a platform dependently software only run with the internet information server on a Windows server machine. To use it with the internet requires an own dedicated windows server.

== See also ==
- FAO
- CountrySTAT technical documentation
