= Regional Data Exchange System =

The Regional Data Exchange System (RDES) was developed under the FAO/Japan project (GCP/RAS/184/JPN) as a web-based platform for the exchange and dissemination of food and agricultural statistics among APCAS (Asia and Pacific Commission on Agricultural Statistics) member countries.

It included a web-based platform and database components, supporting data sharing, standardization, and access from March 2003. The system aimed to strengthen national capacity in statistical analysis and to support agricultural policy and planning. It was later enhanced through integration with CountrySTAT technology.

== Database ==
RDES was designed to contribute to member nations' capacity building and policy analysis through the development of the food and agricultural statistical framework in APCAS (Asia and Pacific Commission on Agricultural Statistics) countries. It is especially expected to role-play the database on food and agricultural statistics for users, such as policy-makers, decision-makers, researchers, etc.

=== Time scale ===
The calendar year is recommended as time scale of the RDES, due to the difference of the crop year in each country.

=== Definitions ===
Definitions of the data should be FAO definitions. The unit of the crop production data are production (metric ton), area harvested (hectare), and yield (kilogram per hectare).

=== Data items ===
Most data of RDES are crop production and livestock data. Although it depends on the background of food production in each country, the major 19 agricultural products in this region are registered as the basic data items: rice, wheat, maize, cereals, cassava, potatoes, pulses, groundnuts, soybean, seed cotton, sugar cane, tea, cattle, pigs, sheep, goats, chicken, milk total, and hen eggs.

Other data for food security that are required by users, such as other crops and livestock, land area, population, prices, fisheries, etc. are provided by each countries on the basis of its situation.

The database functions of RDES has been strengthened with the CountrySTAT technology. RDES with CountrySTAT was launched on 1 November 2006.

== Web Portal ==
RDES is the gateway to agricultural statistics in APCAS countries. There are pages for each country, which contain not only agricultural statistics but also show the country profile, contact address, and hyperlinks for statistics in each country.

RDES also shows the external hyperlinks to related databases, organizations, and associations for agricultural statistics and food security Information, such as the FAOSTAT, UNSTAT, WFP, etc.

== Participating nations ==
RDES is organizing in cooperation with most APCAS member nations: Bangladesh, Bhutan, Cambodia, the People's Republic of China, Fiji, India, Indonesia, Iran, the Lao People's Democratic Republic, Myanmar, Nepal, Pakistan, Philippines, Sri Lanka, Thailand, and Vietnam. Though some other APCAS countries (Australia, Japan (Donor), Malaysia, the Republic of Korea and the United States of America) are not the participants, but RDES is also organized with their cooperation.
