= Microsoft Script Editor =

The Microsoft Script Editor (MSE or "MSE.EXE" or "mse7.exe" in Office 2003) is an optional tool included in Microsoft Office 2000 through Office 2007 and is found in "%ProgramFiles%\Microsoft Office\OFFICE11" directory for Office 2003 (under 32-bit process) and in "%CommonProgramFiles%" directory for other Offices (under 32-bit process ?).

It allows one to work with the HTML code, DHTML objects, and script in an Office document from within an Office application. In addition to this, if installed, Internet Explorer will allow one to debug JavaScript and VBScript with the editor if the "Disable Script Debugging" Internet Explorer preference option is not checked.

In the About Box, it calls itself "Microsoft Development Environment 7.0". It is a trimmed down version of Visual Studio .NET 2002 (7.0)'s IDE.

== See also ==
- Microsoft Script Debugger
