= JScript.Encode =

Javascript encoding method developed by Microsoft

JScript.Encode is a method created by Microsoft used to obfuscate both server and Client-side JavaScript or VB Script source code in order to protect the source code from copying. JavaScript code is used for creating dynamic web content on many websites, with the source code easily viewable, so this was meant to protect the code.

The encoding is a simple polyalphabetic substitution using three alphabets.

== How to use ==
A command line script encoder can be used to encode scripts. To encode a HTML web-page file called default.htm, use the following command:

screnc.exe default.htm defaultenc.htm

It would output to a file called defaultenc.htm.

== Weaknesses ==
It has been reverse engineered and many websites provide an on-the-fly decoder.
