= Object Description Language =

Object Description Language (ODL) was the original interface definition language created by Microsoft for specifying interfaces to be used in OLE Automation. It was a superset of the OMG IDL.

Microsoft provided a utility mktyplib to compile ODL files.

The ODL was merged into the Microsoft Interface Definition Language.
