= LotusScript =

Object-oriented programming language

LotusScript is an object-oriented programming language used by Lotus Notes (since version 4.0) and other Lotus Development products.

LotusScript is similar to Visual Basic. Developers familiar with one can easily understand the syntax and structure of code in the other. The major differences between the two are in their respective integrated development environments and in the product-specific object classes provided in each language that are included. VB includes a richer set of classes for UI manipulation, whereas LotusScript includes a richer set of application-specific classes for Lotus Notes, Lotus Word Pro and Lotus 1-2-3. In the case of Lotus Notes, there are classes to work with Notes databases, documents (records) in those databases, etc. These classes can also be used as OLE Automation objects outside the Lotus Notes environment, from Visual Basic.

LotusScript also allows the definition of user-defined types and classes, although it is not possible to inherit from the product-specific classes. LotusScript programs can access Microsoft Office documents by using the OLE automation in libraries from MS Office.

== See also ==
- IBM Notes Domino Overview
- Visual Basic for Applications
- Microsoft Power Fx
