= ActiveX =

Software framework by Microsoft introduced in 1996

- Original author: Microsoft
- Developer: Microsoft
- Initial release: 1996; 30 years ago
- Final release: 2013
- Written in: C, C++
- Operating system: Microsoft Windows, Solaris, Classic Mac OS, macOS
- Platform: x86
- Included with: Internet Explorer, Microsoft Office, Microsoft Visual Studio, and Windows Media Player etc.
- Predecessor: OLE 2.0 and COM
- Type: Software framework

ActiveX is a deprecated software framework created by Microsoft that adapts its earlier Component Object Model (COM) and Object Linking and Embedding (OLE) technologies for content downloaded from a network, particularly from the World Wide Web. Microsoft introduced ActiveX in 1996. In principle, ActiveX is not dependent on Microsoft Windows operating systems, but in practice, most ActiveX controls only run on Windows. Most also require the client to be running on an x86-based computer because ActiveX controls contain compiled code.

ActiveX is still supported in the "Internet Explorer mode" of Microsoft Edge (which has a different, incompatible extension system, as it is based on Google's Chromium project).

== ActiveX controls ==
ActiveX was one of the major technologies used in component-based software engineering. Compared with JavaBeans, ActiveX supports more programming languages, but JavaBeans supports more platforms. ActiveX is supported in many rapid application development technologies, such as Active Template Library, Delphi, JavaBeans, Microsoft Foundation Class Library, Qt, Visual Basic, Windows Forms and wxWidgets, to enable application developers to embed ActiveX controls into their products.

Many Microsoft Windows applications—including many of those from Microsoft itself, such as Internet Explorer, Microsoft Office, Microsoft Visual Studio, and Windows Media Player—use ActiveX controls to build their feature-set and also encapsulate their own functionality as ActiveX controls which can then be embedded into other applications. Internet Explorer also allows the embedding of ActiveX controls in web pages.

== History ==
Faced with the complexity of OLE 2.0 and with poor support for COM in MFC, Microsoft simplified the specification and rebranded the technology as ActiveX in 1996. Even after simplification, users still required controls to implement about six core interfaces. In response to this complexity, Microsoft produced wizards, ATL base classes, macros and C++ language extensions to make it simpler to write controls.

Starting with Internet Explorer 3.0 (1996), Microsoft added support to host ActiveX controls within HTML content. If the browser encountered a page specifying an ActiveX control via an OBJECT tag (the OBJECT tag was added to the HTML 3.2 specification by Charlie Kindel, the Microsoft representative to the W3C at the time) it would automatically download and install the control with little or no user intervention. This made the web "richer" but provoked objections (since such controls, in practice, ran only on Windows, and separate controls were required for each supported platform: one for Windows 3.1/Windows NT 3.51, one for Windows NT/95, and one for Macintosh M68K/PowerPC.) and security risks (especially given the lack of user intervention). Microsoft subsequently introduced security measures to make browsing including ActiveX safer.

For example:

- digital signing of installation packages (Cabinet files and executables)
- controls must explicitly declare themselves safe for scripting
- increasingly stringent default security settings
- Internet Explorer maintains a blacklist of bad controls

ActiveX was controversial from the start; while Microsoft claimed programming ease and good performance compared to Java applets in its marketing materials, critics of ActiveX were quick to point out security issues and lack of portability, making it impractical for use outside protected intranets. The ActiveX security model relied almost entirely on identifying trusted component developers using a code signing technology called Authenticode. Developers had to register with Verisign (US$20 per year for individuals, $400 for corporations) and sign a contract, promising not to develop malware. Identified code would then run inside the web browser with full permissions, meaning that any bug in the code was a potential security issue; this contrasts with the sandboxing already used in Java at the time.

== Platform support ==
In October 1996, Microsoft released a beta version of the ActiveX Software Development Kit (SDK) for the Macintosh, including a plug-in for Netscape Navigator on the Mac, and announced its plan to support ActiveX on Solaris later that year. Six months and two more beta releases later, there had yet to be any commercially available Macintosh ActiveX plugins.

In 1997, NCompass Labs in cooperation with Microsoft released a plug-in for Netscape Navigator to support ActiveX.

Documentation for ActiveX core technology resides at The Open Group and may be read for free.

Despite Microsoft's previous efforts to make ActiveX cross-platform, most ActiveX controls would not and will not work on all platforms, so using ActiveX controls to implement essential functionality of a web page restricts its usefulness. The government of South Korea, in a software-agnostic gravitating move, started in circa 2015 to remove the technology from their public websites in order to make their website accessible to more platforms.

While Microsoft made significant efforts to push the cross-platform aspect of ActiveX by way of publishing the API, ultimately the cross-platform effort failed due to the ActiveX controls being written in C or C++ and being compiled in Intel x86 Assembly language, making them executable only on Windows machines where they can call the standard Win32 APIs.

Microsoft dropped ActiveX support from the Windows Store edition of Internet Explorer 10 in Windows 8. In 2015, Microsoft released Microsoft Edge [Legacy], the replacement for Internet Explorer, with no support for ActiveX; this event marked the end of ActiveX technology in Microsoft's web browser development. Microsoft [New] Edge, however, includes an "Internet Explorer mode" feature, which supports ActiveX.

== ActiveX in non-Internet Explorer applications ==
- Mozilla ActiveX Control was last updated in late 2005, and runs in Firefox 1.5.
- ScriptActive for Netscape Navigator last updated in 1997 can run ActiveX controls but requires a special HTML tag.
- Running ActiveX scripts in Google Chrome is possible through the utilization of several extensions, including one which emulates an Internet Explorer tab within the Chrome application.

== Other ActiveX technologies ==
Microsoft has developed a large number of products and software platforms using ActiveX objects. They are still used (e.g., websites still using ASP):

- Active Scripting (formerly known as ActiveX Scripting) is the technology used in Windows to bridge scripting engines like JScript, VBScript or ActivePerl and hosting applications like Internet Explorer, Active Server Pages, or third-party applications that implement a scripting host.
- ActiveX Document is a Microsoft technology that allows users to view and edit Microsoft Word, Excel, and PDF documents inside web browsers.
- Active Messaging, later renamed Collaboration Data Objects
- Active Server Pages (ASP)
- ActiveMovie, later renamed DirectShow
- ActiveX Data Objects (ADO)
- ActiveX Streaming Format (ASF), renamed Advanced Streaming Format, then to Advanced Systems Format

== See also ==
- Active Setup
- Active Template Library (ATL)
- Adobe Flex
- Browser Helper Object (BHO)
- Google Native Client – an alternative development from Google
- IUnknown interface
- JavaBeans
- Netscape Plugin Application Programming Interface (NPAPI) – an alternative interface for web-browser plugins
- OLE Automation
- Silverlight (XAP)
- Windows DNA
- XAML Browser Applications (XBAP)
