= Microsoft Interface Definition Language =

Microsoft Interface Definition Language (MIDL) is a text-based interface description language from Microsoft, based on the DCE/RPC IDL which it extends for use with the Microsoft Component Object Model. Its compiler is also called MIDL.

== Version history ==
MIDL 1.0 is a standard DCE/RPC IDL with enhancements made for defining COM coclasses and interfaces.

MIDL 2.0 (also known as MIDLRT) is an updated version of syntax that was developed in-house by Microsoft for use on the Windows platform that allowed for declaring Windows Runtime APIs. Various built in Windows Runtime APIs are written with MIDL 2.0 syntax and are available in the Windows SDK folder.

The most recent version of MIDL is MIDL 3.0 released on December 30, 2021. Version 3.0 is a more streamlined version of MIDL 2.0, utilizing more modern and simplified syntax familiar to C, C++, C#, or Java. MIDL 3.0 is also more concise than the previous versions, allowing for programs to be reduced by almost two thirds in length due to using built-in reasonable defaults for attributes and being more concise.

== See also ==
- Object Description Language
