= XLNT =

Scripting language

- Developer: Advanced Systems Concepts, Inc.
- First appeared: 1997
- OS: Microsoft Windows

Influenced by
- DCL

XLNT (eXtended Language for Windows NT) is a scripting language for Windows platforms based on the DCL language for OpenVMS systems. Developed by Advanced Systems Concepts, Inc. in 1997, XLNT allows Windows users to run scripts similar to those used on OpenVMS systems, making it easier to manage system administration tasks and automate repetitive operations.

== Overview ==
Its proprietary implementation has been maintained by its originator, Advanced Systems Concepts, Inc., since 1997. The implementation contains the XLNT executable, a Windows Scripting Host engine, and an integrated development environment. It can also be used in CGI mode. It is one of the handful of Windows-VMS emulation and interoperability tools, the others being PC-DCL and Accelr8 DCL Lite, both console mode interpreters which can run in an automated (scripting) mode. An older programme of this type, VCL, is used for VMS functionality under MS-DOS, PC DOS, OS/2, and Unix variants. VCL can be run under later Windows versions which provide for 16-bit DOS programmes to be run, e.g. Windows NT via its Win16/DOS environmental subsystem or the program compatibility option in Windows XP et seq.
