= WordBASIC =

- Developer: Microsoft
- First appeared: 1989; 36 years ago
- OS: Microsoft Windows, Mac OS X
- License: Commercial proprietary software

Influenced by
- QuickBASIC

WordBASIC was a subset of Microsoft QuickBASIC customized for word-processing in Microsoft Word. It was replaced by Visual Basic for Applications (VBA) when Word 97 was released. Contrarily to VBA, WordBasic was not object-oriented but consisted of a flat list of approximately 900 commands.

== Example code ==
The following code snippets show the difference between WordBasic and VBA with a "Hello, World!" example:

WordBasic:

Sub MAIN
  FormatFont .Name = "Arial", .Points = 10
  Insert "Hello, World!"
End Sub

VBA:

Public Sub Main()
    With Selection.Font
        .Name = "Arial"
        .Size = 10
    End With
    Selection.TypeText Text:="Hello, World!"
End Sub
