= JScript =

Implementation of ECMAScript by Microsoft

- Paradigms: Multi-paradigm: object-oriented (prototype-based), functional, imperative, scripting
- Family: ECMAScript
- Developer: Microsoft
- First appeared: 1996; 30 years ago
- Final release: 9.0 / March 2011; 15 years ago
- Typing discipline: dynamic, weak, duck
- Scope: lexical
- OS: Microsoft Windows
- License: proprietary
- Filename extensions: .js, .jse, .wsf, .wsc (.htm, .html, .hta, .asp)
- Website: learn.microsoft.com/en-us/previous-versions/hbxc2t98(v=vs.85)

Major implementations
- Active Scripting, JScript .NET

Influenced by
- JavaScript

JScript is Microsoft's legacy dialect of the ECMAScript standard that is used in Microsoft's Internet Explorer web browser and HTML Applications, and as a standalone Windows scripting language. It is proprietary software.

JScript is implemented as an Active Scripting engine. This means that it can be "plugged in" to OLE Automation applications that support Active Scripting, such as Internet Explorer, Active Server Pages, and Windows Script Host. It also means such applications can use multiple Active Scripting languages, e.g., JScript, VBScript or PerlScript.

JScript was first supported in the Internet Explorer 3.0 browser released in August 1996. Its most recent version is JScript 9.0, included in Internet Explorer 9.

JScript 10.0 is a separate dialect, also known as JScript .NET, which adds several new features from the abandoned fourth edition of the ECMAScript standard. It must be compiled for .NET Framework version 2 or version 4, but static type annotations are optional.

JScript has been criticized for being insecure and having multiple security bugs "exploited by nation-state actors", leading Microsoft to add an option to disable it.

== Comparison to JavaScript ==
As explained by Douglas Crockford in his talk titled The JavaScript Programming Language on YUI Theater,

[Microsoft] did not want to deal with Sun Microsystems about the trademark issue, and so they called their implementation JScript. A lot of people think that JScript and JavaScript are different but similar languages. That's not the case. They are just different names for the same language, and the reason the names are different was to get around trademark issues.

However, JScript supports conditional compilation, which allows a programmer to selectively execute code within block comments. This is an extension to the ECMAScript standard that is unsupported in other JavaScript implementations, thus making the above statement not fully true, although conditional compilation is no longer supported in Internet Explorer 11 Standards mode.

Other internal implementation differences between JavaScript and JScript, at some point in time, are noted on the Microsoft Developer Network (MSDN). The default type value for the script element in Internet Explorer is JavaScript, while JScript was its alias. In an apparent transition from JScript to JavaScript, online, the Microsoft Edge [Legacy] Developer Guide refers to the Mozilla MDN web reference library as its definitive documentation. As of October 2017, Microsoft MSDN pages for scripting in Internet Explorer are being redirected there as well. This information may not include JScript specific objects, such as Enumerator, which are listed in the JavaScript language reference on Microsoft Docs. Those provide additional features that are not included in the ECMA Standards, whether they are supported in the Edge [Legacy] browser or its predecessor.

== Versions ==
=== JScript (COM Classic) ===
The original JScript is an Active Scripting engine. Like other Active Scripting languages, it is built on the COM/OLE Automation platform and provides scripting capabilities to host applications.

This is the version used when hosting JScript inside a Web page displayed by Internet Explorer, in an HTML application before IE9, as well as in classic ASP, Windows Script Host scripts and other Automation environments.

JScript is sometimes referred to as "classic JScript" or "Active Scripting JScript" to differentiate it from newer .NET-based versions.

Some versions of JScript are available for multiple versions of Internet Explorer and Windows. For example, JScript 5.7 was introduced with Internet Explorer 7.0 and is also installed for Internet Explorer 6.0 with Windows XP Service Pack 3, while JScript 5.8 was introduced with Internet Explorer 8.0 and is also installed with Internet Explorer 6.0 on Windows Mobile 6.5.

Microsoft's implementation of ECMAScript 5th Edition in Windows 8 Consumer Preview is called JavaScript and the corresponding Visual Studio 11 Express Beta includes a "completely new", full-featured JavaScript editor with IntelliSense enhancements for HTML5 and ECMAScript 5 syntax, "VSDOC" annotations for multiple overloads, simplified DOM configuration, brace matching, collapsible outlining and "go to definition".

Version	Date	Introduced with	Based on (Note: JScript supports various features not specified in the ECMA standard, as does JavaScript.)	Similar JavaScript version
1.0	Aug 1996	Internet Explorer 3.0	Netscape JavaScript	1.0
2.0	Jan 1997	Windows IIS 3.0	Netscape JavaScript	1.1
3.0	Oct 1997	Internet Explorer 4.0	ECMA-262 1st edition (Note: Microsoft said JScript 3.0 was "the first scripting language to fully conform to the ECMA-262 standard".)	1.3
4.0		Visual Studio 6.0 (as part of Visual InterDev)	ECMA-262 1st edition	1.3
5.0	Mar 1999	Internet Explorer 5.0	ECMA-262 2nd edition	1.4
5.1		Internet Explorer 5.01	ECMA-262 2nd edition	1.4
5.5	Jul 2000	Internet Explorer 5.5 & Windows CE 4.2	ECMA-262 3rd edition	1.5
5.6	Oct 2001	Internet Explorer 6.0 & Windows CE 5.0	ECMA-262 3rd edition	1.5
5.7	Nov 2006	Internet Explorer 7.0	ECMA-262 3rd edition + ECMA-327 (ES-CP) (Note: JScript 5.7 includes an implementation of the ECMAScript Compact Profile (ECMA-327) which turns off features not required by the ES-CP when using the "JScript.Compact" ProgID.)	1.5
5.8	Mar 2009	Internet Explorer 8.0 & Internet Explorer Mobile 6.0	ECMA-262 3rd edition + ECMA-327 (ES-CP) + JSON (RFC 4627)	1.5
11.0	Jun 2024	Windows 11 version 24H2	(JScript 9 Legacy, designed as a compatible drop-in replacement for JScript 5.8, but not 100% compatible)	1.5

JScript is also available on Windows CE (included in Windows Mobile, optional in Windows Embedded CE). The Windows CE version lacks Active Debugging.

=== Managed JScript ===
Managed JScript is an implementation of JScript for the Dynamic Language Runtime, it is part of Microsoft's dynamic languages for .NET along with IronRuby, IronPython, and Dynamic Visual Basic. Unlike JScript .NET, which is less dynamic than the original JScript but provides Common Language Infrastructure (CLI) compatibility, Managed JScript is designed on top of the Dynamic Language Runtime (DLR) and provides the features needed for scripting scenarios.

While it is primarily designed to be used within Silverlight and ASP.NET at this time, it can also easily be embedded within any .NET application.

Two builds of Managed JScript exist: one for the Desktop Common Language Runtime (CLR) and one for the Silverlight CoreCLR

Version	Date	Introduced with	Based on	Platform
1.0.0.0	2007	ASP.NET Futures (July 2007 preview)	ECMA-262 3rd edition	Desktop CLR 2.0
1.1.20625.0	2007	Microsoft Silverlight 1.1 Alpha (Sep 2007 refresh)	ECMA-262 3rd edition	CoreCLR 1.1

Managed JScript is unsupported in the .NET Compact Framework.

(Source: files versions of Microsoft.JScript.Runtime.dll in ASP.NET Futures and Silverlight 1.1 folders)

=== JScript "Chakra" (JsRT) ===
JScript "Chakra" is based on the JScript (COM classic) version, but it has been redesigned to improve performance in Internet Explorer 9 at the expense of proper Active Scripting engine compatibility. It requires a specific Microsoft JavaScript Hosting (JsRT) API for proper use. Therefore, it is installed side by side with JScript 5.x and is only used by Internet Explorer 9 and later as well as JsRT hosts, while other Active Scripting hosts keep using the 5.x version when requesting the JScript engine.

Version	Date	Introduced with	Based on	Similar JavaScript version
Chakra 9.0	Mar 2011	Internet Explorer 9.0	ECMA-262 5th edition	1.8.1
Chakra 10.0	Sep 2012	Internet Explorer 10.0	ECMA-262 5th edition	
Chakra 11.0	Oct 2013	Internet Explorer 11.0	ECMA-262 5th edition	
Chakra Edge	Jul 2015	Edge [Legacy] / Windows 10	ECMA-262 5th to 9th (2018) edition (kept up to date without engine versioning)	

There are two versions of the Chakra JsRT engine. The original one was used by Internet Explorer 9 and later, and is sometimes referred to as "jscript9.dll" or "legacy Chakra engine", and a second one used by Microsoft Edge Legacy browser and sometimes referred to as "new Chakra engine", "Edge engine" or "Chakra.dll". Both Chakra JsRT versions can be used by other applications using the JsRT API and can be installed side by side.

There is also a COM Classic version of Chakra internally called "JScript 9 Legacy" (provided by jscript9Legacy.dll), introduced with Windows 11 24H2, which brings back compatibility with Active Scripting hosts and intended as a compatible drop-in replacement for JScript 5.8. Although largely compatible with the original JScript 5.8, there are notable breaking differences.

See separate page about new Chakra (Edge) engine.

=== JScript .NET (CLI) ===
JScript .NET is a Microsoft .NET implementation of JScript. It is a CLI language and thus inherits very powerful features, but lacks many features of the original JScript language, making it inappropriate for many scripting scenarios. JScript .NET can be used for ASP.NET pages and for complete .NET applications, but the lack of support for this language in Microsoft Visual Studio places it more as an upgrade path for classic ASP using classic JScript than as a new first-class language.

Version	Platform	Date	Introduced with	Based on
7.0	Desktop CLR 1.0	2002-01-05	.NET Framework 1.0	ECMA-262 3rd edition (Note: JScript .NET is "being developed in conjunction with ECMAScript Edition 4".)
7.1	Desktop CLR 1.1	2003-04-01	.NET Framework 1.1	ECMA-262 3rd edition
8.0	Desktop CLR 2.0	2005-11-07	.NET Framework 2.0	ECMA-262 3rd edition
10.0	Desktop CLR 4.0	2010-08-03	.NET Framework 4.0	ECMA-262 3rd edition

JScript .NET is unsupported in the .NET Compact Framework.

JScript .NET versions are unrelated to classic JScript versions, and are a separate product line. Even though JScript .NET is unsupported within the Visual Studio IDE, its versions are in sync with other .NET languages versions (C#, VB.NET, VC++) that follow their corresponding Visual Studio versions.

.NET Framework 3.0 and 3.5 are built on 2.0 and do not include the newer JScript.NET release (version 10.0 for .NET Framework 4.0).

(Source: file version of jsc.exe JScript.NET compiler and Microsoft.JScript.dll installed with .NET Framework)

== See also ==
- JScript.Encode
- Windows Script File
- Windows Script Host
- WinJS
