= Active Server Pages =

Microsoft server-side scripting language and engine

Active Server Pages (ASP)
- Developer: Microsoft
- Stable release: 3.0 / February 17, 2000; 26 years ago
- Type: Web application framework
- License: Proprietary software
- Website: learn.microsoft.com/en-us/previous-versions/iis/6.0-sdk/ms526064(v=vs.90)

Active Server Pages
- Filename extension: .asp
- Developed by: Microsoft

Active Server Pages (ASP) is Microsoft's first server-side scripting language and engine for dynamic web pages.

It was first released in December 1996, before being superseded in January 2002 by ASP.NET.

== History ==
Initially released as an add-on to Internet Information Services (IIS) via the Windows NT 4.0 Option Pack (1996), it is included as a component of Windows Server (since the initial release of Windows 2000 Server). There have been three versions of ASP, each introduced with different versions of IIS:

- ASP 1.0 was released in December 1996 as part of IIS 3.0
- ASP 2.0 was released in September 1997 as part of IIS 4.0
- ASP 3.0 was released in November 2000 as part of IIS 5.0

ASP 2.0 provides six built-in objects: Application, ASPError, Request, Response, Server, and Session. A Session object, for example, represents a session that maintains the state of variables from page to page. The Active Scripting engine's support of the Component Object Model enables ASP websites to access functionality in compiled libraries such as dynamic-link libraries.

ASP 3.0 does not differ greatly from ASP 2.0 but it does offer some additional enhancements such as Server.Transfer method, Server.Execute method, and an enhanced ASPError object. ASP 3.0 also enables buffering by default and optimized the engine for better performance.

ASP was supported until 14 January 2020 on Windows 7. The use of ASP pages was supported on Windows 8 for 10 years following the operating system's release, concluding with the end of its extended support in January 2023. ASP is supported in all available versions of IIS as of 2025.

== Architecture ==
ASP uses scripting on the server to generate content that is sent to the client's web browser via HTTP response. The ASP interpreter reads and executes all script code between <% and %> tags, the result of which is content generation. These scripts were written using VBScript, JScript, or PerlScript. The @Language directive, the <script language="language" runat="server" /> syntax or server configuration can be used to select the language. In the example below, Response.Write Now() is in an HTML page; it would be dynamically replaced by the current time of the server.

Server side

The server's current time:
<%
Response.Write Now()
%>

Client Side

The server's current time:
8/11/2015 6:24:45 PM

Web pages with the .asp filename extension use ASP, although some web sites disguise their choice of scripting language for security purposes by using the more common .htm or .html extensions. Pages with the .aspx extension use compiled ASP.NET; however, ASP.NET pages may still include some ASP scripting. The introduction of ASP.NET led to use of the term Classic ASP for the original technology.

Sun Java System ASP (formerly ChiliSoft ASP) was a popular and reportedly complete emulator, but it has been discontinued.

=== The Session object ===
Stores variables accessible only to a single visitor, which are local variables.

<%
If Len(Request.QueryString("name")) > 0 Then
     Session("name") = Request.QueryString("name") 
End If

Response.Write "Welcome " & Server.HTMLEncode(Session("name")) & "!"
%>

The session object is file based and multiple concurrent read and/or write requests will be blocked and processed in turn.

== See also ==
- ASP.NET
- Template processor
- Comparison of web template engines
- Jakarta Server Pages
- PHP
- Common Gateway Interface
