= Visual Basic =

Visual Basic is a name for a family of programming languages from Microsoft. It may refer to one or more, or all of:

- Visual Basic (.NET), the current version of Visual Basic launched in 2002 which runs on .NET
- Visual Basic (classic), the original Visual Basic supported from 1991 to 2008
- Embedded Visual Basic, the classic version geared toward embedded applications
- Visual Basic for Applications, an implementation of Visual Basic 6 built into programs such as Microsoft Office and used for writing macros
- VBScript, an Active Scripting language based on VB6, actively maintained from 1996–2023
