= CDF =

CDF is a three-letter acronym that may refer to:

== Mathematics, science, and computers ==
- .cdf (formerly known as "AIA Format"), the ANDI/netCDF scientific data interchange file format
- Cation diffusion facilitator, transport protein
- Channel Definition Format, an XML standard
- Chip Description File, a genomic analysis file format
- Chlorinated dibenzofuran(s), a.k.a. polychlorinated dibenzofurans
- Cohen–Daubechies–Feauveau wavelet
- Collider Detector at Fermilab
- Comma-delimited format, now referred to as .csv (comma-separated values)
- Common Data Format, NASA software
- Composite Document File, a Microsoft compound document file format
- Compound Document Format, a set of W3C standards on a specific compound document format
- Computable Document Format, a format for interactive data visualizations
- Core Damage Frequency, a term used in probabilistic risk assessment for nuclear power plants
- Cumulative distribution function

== Organizations ==
- California Department of Forestry and Fire Protection
- Canal del Fútbol (Chile)
- Children's Defense Fund (US)
- "Congregation for the Doctrine of the Faith (CDF)": former name of Dicastery for the Doctrine of the Faith (DDF)
- Crypto Developers Forum

=== Defence and military ===
- Ceylon Defence Force
- Chief of the Defence Force (disambiguation), position in multiple countries
- Chinland Defense Force, an insurgent group fighting against the State Administration Council (a military junta) in Chin State, Myanmar
- Ciskei Defence Force
- Civil Defence Forces, paramilitary organization in Sierra Leone

=== Development ===
- Constituency Development Fund
- Cooperative Development Foundation (US)
- Cooperative Development Fund
- Colonial Development Fund

== Transport ==
- Cardiff Central railway station, National Rail station code CDF
- Cortina Airport, Italy (IATA code CDF)

== Other ==
- CDF Croisières de France, a cruise ship operator
- Chesapeake Detention Facility
- Clostridioides difficile
- ESA's Concurrent Design Facility at ESTEC
- Congolese franc, the ISO 4217 code for the currency of the Democratic Republic of Congo
- Constructive developmental framework for psychological assessment
- Carlos Diego Ferreira, a Brazilian mixed martial artist
- Caspar David Friedrich, a German artist
