= Ingex =

Software for digital capture of audio and video data

Ingex is an open-source (GPL) suite of software for the digital capture of audio and video data, without the need for traditional audio or video tape or cassettes. Serial digital interface (SDI) capture is supported, as well as real-time transcoding (with MXF). Portions of the software suite also act as a network file server for media files, as well as archiving to LTO-3 data tape. Audio and video media files can also be stored on USB hard drives or Network Attached Storage. The software is heavily used by the BBC, and was developed by the BBC Research Laboratory.

Some of the early production projects which have used Ingex include a Foo Fighters music video, and the BBC television series Dragons' Den.

== Features ==
The different software products in the suite support:

- Multi-camera video capture in a studio environment
- Video tape archive preservation
- Acting as a server to Avid editing clients

Media Harmony is a module for Samba Virtual file system (VFS). This allows editing clients, such as Avid, to use low-cost commodity storage for video and media files.

Ingex Studio provides studio-style recoding, capture, transcode, and MXF wrapping for multiple cameras, also known as multi-camera tapeless recording. The software runs on commodity PC hardware and SDI IO cards. The media can then be edited by MXF-based editors, for example, Avid Media Composer.

== Supported formats ==
Currently supported standard-definition (SD) codecs are:

- Avid-compatible JPEG codec resolutions known as 2:1, 3:1, 10:1, 20:1, 15:1s, 10:1m, 4:1m
- DVCPRO50 (50Mbit/s) and DV (25Mbit/s)
- IMX 50/40/30 (50/40/30 Mbit/s)
- Uncompressed standard-definition video at 8 bits-per-sample and 10 bits-per-sample

Supported high-definition (HD) codecs are:

- DNxHD (VC-3) at 120 Mbit/s and 185 Mbit/s
- DVCPRO HD
- Uncompressed high-definition video at 8 bits-per-sample

libMXF supports:

- MXF
- uncompressed video or audio, DV25/50, IMX, JPEG, DNxHD and DVCProHD files
- writes MXF OP-Atom files which can be used directly in Avid Media Composer and related editors

MediaHarmony supports:

- media_harmony - per-client .pmr and .mdb database files so there are no conflicts between Avid editors
- mxf_harmony - on-the-fly unwrapping of MXF-wrapped DV essence so that a Final Cut Pro client can share the same DV media files as an Avid client

Ingex archive supports:

- MXF OP-1A file container, containing audio, video, and timecode data (also known as OP-1A MXF)
- LTO-3 data tape
- Video SMPTE 384M uncompressed 4:2:2 video at 8 bits per sample in UYVY format
- Audio SMPTE 382M uncompressed PCM audio at 48 kHz and 20 bits per sample
- LTO barcode information
- POSIX.1-2001 archive format (also known as pax Interchange format), a superset of the tar format which overcomes the 8 GiB limitation of tar format, to ensure future access to programmes

Metadata:

- Advanced Authoring Format (AAF) is used for storing edition metadata.

== Supported operating systems ==
- libMXF: Microsoft Windows, Mac OS X, Linux
- Ingex Studio: openSUSE Linux

== See also ==
- Comparison of video editing software
- Video server
- Video editing software
- Photo slideshow software
- Video scratching
- Edit Decision List
