= CDFS =

CDFS may refer to:

- CDfs, a Linux virtual file system that provides access to individual data and audio tracks on compact discs
  - cdfs, a Plan 9 user-space program that provides access to individual data and audio tracks on compact discs
- Compact Disc File System, or ISO 9660
- CDFS, an acronym in electrical engineering that has the meaning of inquiring the status of the Schematic completion from the DCM entity (Cand Dracului Faci Schema)
- Chandra Deep Field South, an astronomical survey in the constellation Fornax

== See also ==
- CDF (disambiguation)
