= Andrew C. Oliver =

21st century businessman

Andrew C. Oliver is a former board member of the Open Source Initiative, the founder of the Apache POI project, and former member of the Apache Software Foundation. Mr. Oliver was one of the developers of JBoss and an entrepreneur. Former JBoss Vice President of Corporate Strategy, Robert Bickel, credits Oliver as being a pioneer and face of JBoss to many of its customers. He is also a columnist for Infoworld, writing mainly on application development topics.

== POI ==
Oliver started POI in April 2001 while working on a short-term contract project when he became frustrated that Actuate had purchased the previous proprietary API he had used and raised the price to $10,000. He contacted his local Java User Group and found Marc Johnson and the two ported Microsoft Compound Document Format to Java. Originally they intended to donate this to the Apache Cocoon project, but later it was decided that POI should be its own top level project.

In December 2008, Oliver resigned from the project over concerns that the team was not taking legal issues seriously, particularly that Microsoft had donated a large amount of code by proxy without being asked to make more specific patent assurances that were covered in its Open Specification Promise. Other members of the PMC attempted to ask Oliver to reconsider.
