= Apache POI =

Open-source API to access Microsoft Office formats

- Developer: The Apache Software Foundation
- Stable release: 5.5.1 / November 30, 2025; 9 months ago
- Written in: Java
- Platform: Cross-platform
- Type: API to access Microsoft Office file formats
- License: Apache License 2.0
- Website: poi.apache.org
- Repository: POI Repository

Apache POI, a project run by the Apache Software Foundation, and previously a sub-project of the Jakarta Project, provides pure Java libraries for reading and writing files in Microsoft Office formats, such as Word, PowerPoint and Excel.

== History and roadmap ==
The name was originally an acronym for "Poor Obfuscation Implementation", referring humorously to the fact that the file formats seemed to be deliberately obfuscated, but poorly, since they were successfully reverse-engineered. This explanation – and those of the similar names for the various sub-projects – were removed from the official web pages in order to better market the tools to businesses who would not consider such humor appropriate. The original authors (Andrew C. Oliver and Marc Johnson) also noted the existence of the Hawaiian poi dish, made of mashed taro root, which had similarly derogatory connotations.

=== Office Open XML support ===
POI supports the ISO/IEC 29500:2008 Office Open XML file formats since version 3.5. A significant contribution for OOXML support came from Sourcesense, an open source company which was commissioned by Microsoft to develop this contribution. This link spurred controversy, some POI contributors questioning POI OOXML patent protection regarding Microsoft's Open Specification Promise patent license.

== Architecture ==
The Apache POI project contains the following subcomponents (meaning of acronyms is taken from old documentation):

- POIFS (Poor Obfuscation Implementation File System) – This component reads and writes Microsoft's OLE 2 compound document format. Since all Microsoft Office files are OLE 2 files, this component is the basic building block of all the other POI elements. POIFS can therefore be used to read a wider variety of files, beyond those whose explicit decoders are already written in POI.
- HSSF (Horrible SpreadSheet Format) – reads and writes Microsoft Excel (XLS) format files. It can read files written by Excel 97 onwards; this file format is known as the BIFF 8 format. As the Excel file format is complex and contains a number of tricky characteristics, some of the more advanced features cannot be read.
- XSSF (XML SpreadSheet Format) – reads and writes Office Open XML (XLSX) format files. Similar feature set to HSSF, but for Office Open XML files.
- HPSF (Horrible Property Set Format) – reads "Document Summary" information from Microsoft Office files. This is essentially the information that one can see by using the File|Properties menu item within an Office application.
- HWPF (Horrible Word Processor Format) – aims to read and write Microsoft Word 97 (DOC) format files. This component is in initial stages of development.
- XWPF (XML Word Processor Format) – similar feature set to HWPF, but for Office Open XML files.
- HSLF (Horrible Slide Layout Format) – a pure Java implementation for Microsoft PowerPoint files. This provides the ability to read, create and edit presentations (though some things are easier to do than others)
- XSLF (Open Office XML Slideshow Format)
- HDGF (Horrible DiaGram Format) – an initial pure Java implementation for Microsoft Visio binary files. It provides an ability to read the low level contents of the files.
- HPBF (Horrible PuBlisher Format) – a pure Java implementation for Microsoft Publisher files.
- HSMF (Horrible Stupid Mail Format) – a pure Java implementation for Microsoft Outlook MSG files.
- DDF (Dreadful Drawing Format) – a package for decoding the Microsoft Office Drawing format.
- XDDF (XML Dreadful Drawing Format)

The HSSF component is the most advanced feature of the library. Other components (HPSF, HWPF, and HSLF) are usable, but less full-featured.

The POI library is also provided as a Ruby or ColdFusion extension.

There are modules for Big Data platforms (e.g. Apache Hive/Apache Flink/Apache Spark), which provide certain functionality of Apache POI, such as the processing of Excel files.

== Version history ==
Unsupported
Supported
Latest version
Future version

Version number	Date of release
6.0.0	2026
5.5.1	November 30, 2025
5.5.0	November 15, 2025
5.4.1	April 6, 2025
5.4.0	January 8, 2025
5.3.0	July 2, 2024
5.2.5	November 25, 2023
5.2.4	September 28, 2023
5.2.3	September 16, 2022
5.2.2	March 19, 2022
5.2.1	March 3, 2022
5.2.0	January 14, 2022
5.1.0	November 1, 2021
5.0.0	January 20, 2021
4.1.0	April 9, 2019
4.0.0	September 7, 2018
3.17	September 15, 2017
3.16	April 19, 2017
3.15	September 21, 2016
3.14	March 2, 2016
3.13	September 29, 2015
3.12	May 11, 2015
3.11	December 21, 2014
3.10	February 8, 2014
3.9	December 3, 2012
3.8	March 26, 2012
3.7	October 29, 2010
3.6	December 14, 2009
3.5	September 28, 2009
3.2	October 19, 2008
3.1	June 29, 2008
3.0	May 18, 2007
2.5	February 29, 2004
2.0	January 26, 2004
1.5	May 6, 2002
1.2.0	January 19, 2002
1.1.0	January 4, 2002
1.0.0	December 30, 2001

== See also ==
- Open Packaging Conventions
- Office Open XML software
