= SNP file format =

Snapshot File
- Filename extension: .snp
- Internet media type: application/vnd.ms-access, image/x-snp
- Developed by: Microsoft
- Type of format: Access report output, multi-page, precise
- Container for: EMF (contained pages)
- Contained by: CAB (compression wrapper)

The SNP file format was used by Microsoft Access to store Report Snapshots in a single file which can be viewed and printed by the Microsoft Snapshot Viewer, a Windows program available free of charge from Microsoft that allows report output to be viewed without requiring Access. Support for the format was discontinued in Access 2010 and later versions; Access reports can be exported in PDF/XPS and Excel formats viewable on many platforms.

SNP files are based on the Microsoft Compound File Binary Format (CFBF), which is also the basis for the Advanced Authoring Format (AAF). CFBF is a reasonably simple container format which can store multiple files, directories and so on. For SNP files, Microsoft Access uses CFBF to store each page as a separate Enhanced Metafile (EMF)-like format containing all of the graphics commands required to reproduce the page.

The last CFBF record in an SNP file is a 'HEADER' file, which primarily contains a DEVMODE structure. Data from this structure is used to render the SNP file in Microsoft Snapshot Viewer, in conjunction with the default printer selected.

As CFBF files are not compressed, Microsoft's CAB format is used to reduce the size of the CFBF, producing a file which may be only a few kilobytes in size for each page of text and simple graphics—lines, boxes, etc.
