= SDTI =

SDTI may stand for:

- Serial Data Transport Interface, a way of transmitting data packets
- San Diego Trolley, Inc., an American public transport operator
- Suspected deep tissue injury, a medical abbreviation
