= Compound Document Format =

Document file format

- Developed by: W3C
- Type of format: Document file format
- Extended from: XML, SVG, XHTML, SMIL, XForms
- Website: CDF

Compound Document Format (CDF) is a set of W3C candidate standards describing electronic compound document file formats that contains multiple formats, such as SVG, XHTML, SMIL and XForms. The core standards are the Web Integration Compound Document and the Compound Document by Reference Framework (CDR). As of August 19, 2010, the Compound Document Format working group has been closed; W3C's development of the standard has discontinued.

== See also ==
- Electronic prescribing
- Compound File Binary Format
