= Broadcast Exchange Format =

File format for broadcasting industry

Broadcast Exchange Format (BXF) is an SMPTE standard for data exchange in the broadcasting industry.

== History ==
BXF was developed to replace various archaic types of exchange for playlists, record lists and other data in broadcasting. Version 1.0 (SMPTE standard 2021) was published in 2008. Over 150 SMPTE members have been involved in defining the standard. BXF is XML based.

== See also ==
- AAF, Advanced Authoring Format
- BWF, broadcast Wave Format
- MXF, Material eXchange Format
