= Bonobo (GNOME) =

Obsolete component framework for the GNOME free desktop environment

Bonobo is an obsolete component framework for the GNOME free desktop environment. Bonobo is designed to create reusable software components and compound documents. Through its development history it resembles Microsoft's OLE technology and is GNOME's equivalent of KDE's KParts.

Bonobo was developed as a solution to the problems and requirements of the free software community in the development of complex applications. Bonobo is based on the Common Object Request Broker Architecture (CORBA) or its GNOME implementation ORBit. Through Bonobo the functions of one application can be integrated into another: for example, Gnumeric spreadsheet tables can be directly embedded into AbiWord text document by including Gnumeric as Bonobo component.

Available components are:

- Gnumeric spreadsheet
- ggv PostScript viewer
- Xpdf PDF viewer
- gill SVG viewer

== History ==
Inspired by Microsoft's OLE, Bonobo was originally developed by Ximian for compound documents. Bonobo was included for the first time in Gnome 1.2 in May 2000. As of GNOME 2.4, Bonobo is officially considered obsolete, and developers are advised to switch to alternatives such as D-Bus or the GIO component of GLib instead. D-Bus replaced Bonobo as part of the Ridley project. Final results should be released in GTK+ 3.0. Bonobo and ORBit libraries were removed from GNOME in version 2.22.
