= Runtime Callable Wrapper =

A Runtime Callable Wrapper (RCW) is a proxy object generated by the .NET Common Language Runtime (CLR) in order to allow a Component Object Model (COM) object to be accessed from managed code. Although the RCW appears to be an ordinary object to .NET clients, its primary function is to marshal calls and data between a .NET client and a COM object.

For example, a managed application written in C# might make use of an existing COM library written in C++ or Visual Basic 6, via RCWs.

The runtime creates exactly one RCW for each COM object, regardless of the number of references that exist on that object. The runtime maintains a single RCW per process for each object. If you create an RCW in one application domain or apartment, and then pass a reference to another application domain or apartment, a proxy to the first object will be used.
