= Compound document =

Electronic document format

In computing, a compound document is a document that "combines multiple document formats, either by reference, by inclusion, or both." Compound documents are often produced using word processing software, and may include text and non-text elements such as barcodes, spreadsheets, pictures, digital videos, digital audio, and other multimedia features.

The first public implementation of compound documents was on the Xerox Star workstation, released in 1981.

Compound document technologies are commonly utilized on top of a software componentry framework, but the idea of software componentry includes several other concepts apart from compound documents, and software components alone do not enable compound documents. Well-known technologies for compound documents include:

- ActiveX Documents
- Bonobo by Ximian (obsolete, primarily used by GNOME)
- KParts in KDE
- Mixed Object Document Content Architecture
- Multipurpose Internet Mail Extensions (MIME)
- Object linking and embedding (OLE) by Microsoft; see Compound File Binary Format
- Open Document Architecture from ITU-T (not used)
- OpenDoc by IBM and Apple Computer (now defunct)
- RagTime
- Verdantium
- XML and XSL are encapsulation formats used for compound documents of all kinds

== See also ==
- COM Structured Storage
- Multiple-document interface
- Transclusion
