= DV (video format) =

Digital video codecs and tape formats

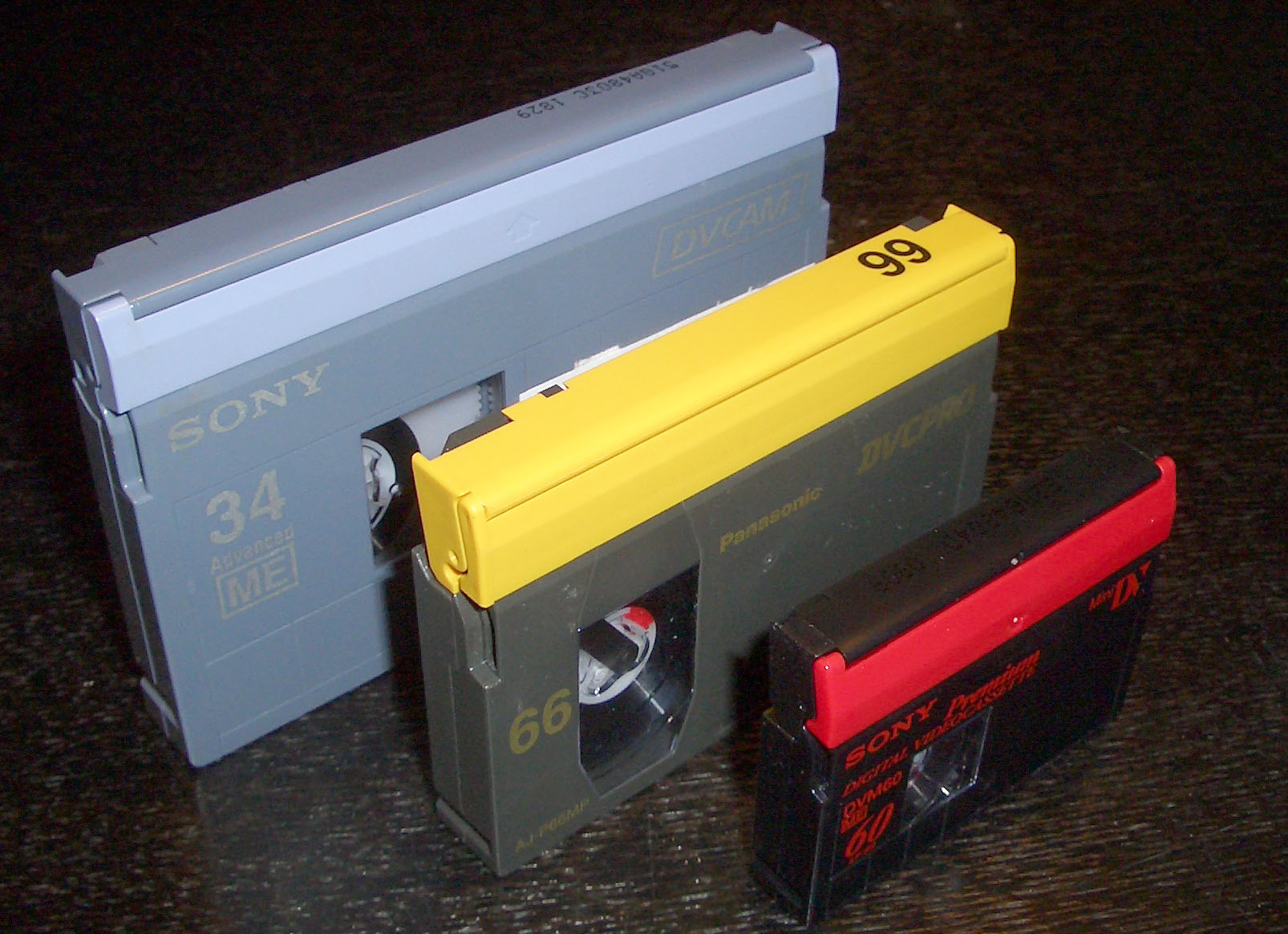
- DV cassettes: DVCAM-L, DVCPRO-M, MiniDV
- Media type: Magnetic cassette tape
- Encoding: DV
- Read mechanism: Helical scan
- Write mechanism: Helical scan
- Developed by: Sony; Panasonic
- Usage: Camcorders, Home movies
- Released: 1995; 31 years ago

DV (from Digital Video) is a family of codecs and tape formats used for storing digital video, launched in 1995 by a consortium of video camera manufacturers led by Sony and Panasonic. It includes the cassette formats DV, MiniDV, DVCAM, DVCPro, DVCPro50, DVCProHD, Digital8, and Digital-S. DV has been used primarily for video recording with camcorders in the amateur and professional sectors.

DV was designed to be a standard for home video using digital data instead of analog. Compared to the analog Video8 and Hi8, VHS-C and VHS formats, DV features a higher video resolution (on par with professional-grade Digital Betacam); it records uncompressed 16-bit PCM audio like CD. In the late 1990s and early 2000s, DV was strongly associated with the transition from analog to digital desktop video production, and also with several enduring prosumer camera designs such as the Sony DCR-VX1000.

In 2003, DV was joined by a successor format called HDV, which used the same tapes but with an updated video codec with high-definition video; HDV cameras could typically switch between DV and HDV recording modes.

In the 2010s, DV rapidly grew obsolete as cameras using memory cards and solid-state drives became the norm, recording at higher bitrates and resolutions that were impractical for mechanical tape formats. Additionally, as manufacturers switched from interlaced to superior progressive recording methods, they broke the interoperability that had previously been maintained across multiple generations of DV and HDV equipment.

== Development ==
DV was developed by the HD Digital VCR Association: in April 1994, 55 companies worldwide took part, which developed the standards and specifications of the format.

The original DV specification, known as Blue Book, was standardized within the IEC 61834 family of standards. These standards define common features such as physical videocassettes, recording modulation method, magnetization, and basic system data in part 1. Part 2 describes the specifics of video systems supporting 525-60 for NTSC and 625-50 for PAL.

== Compression ==
DV uses lossy compression of video while audio is stored uncompressed. An intraframe video compression scheme is used to compress video on a frame-by-frame basis with the discrete cosine transform (DCT).

Closely following the ITU-R Rec. 601 standard, DV employs interlaced scanning with the luminance sampling frequency of 13.5 MHz. This results in 480 scanlines per complete frame for the 60 Hz system, and 576 scanlines per complete frame for the 50 Hz system. In both systems the active area contains 720 pixels per scanline, with 704 pixels used for content and 16 pixels on the sides left for digital blanking. The same frame size is used for 4:3 and 16:9 frame aspect ratios, resulting in different pixel aspect ratios for fullscreen and widescreen video.

Prior to the DCT compression stage, chroma subsampling is applied to the source video in order to reduce the amount of data to be compressed. Baseline DV uses 4:1:1 subsampling in its 60 Hz variant and 4:2:0 subsampling in the 50 Hz variant. Low chroma resolution of DV (compared to higher-end digital video formats) is a reason this format is sometimes avoided in chroma keying applications, though advances in chroma keying techniques and software have made producing quality keys from DV material possible.

Audio can be stored in either of two forms: 16-bit linear PCM stereo at 48 kHz sampling rate (768 kbit/s per channel, 1.5 Mbit/s stereo), or four nonlinear 12-bit PCM channels at 32 kHz sampling rate (384 kbit/s per channel, 1.5 Mbit/s for four channels). In addition, the DV specification also supports 16-bit audio at 44.1 kHz (706 kbit/s per channel, 1.4 Mbit/s stereo), the same sampling rate used for CD audio. In practice, the 48 kHz stereo mode is used almost exclusively.

== Digital Interface Format ==
The audio, video, and metadata are packaged into 80-byte Digital Interface Format (DIF) blocks which are multiplexed into a 150-block sequence. DIF blocks are the basic units of DV streams and can be stored as computer files in raw form or wrapped in such file formats as Audio Video Interleave (AVI), QuickTime (QT) and Material Exchange Format (MXF). One video frame is formed from either 10 or 12 such sequences, depending on scanning rate, which results in a data rate of about 25 Mbit/s for video, and an additional 1.5 Mbit/s for audio. When written to tape, each sequence corresponds to one complete track.

Baseline DV employs unlocked audio. This means that the sound may be a third of a frame out of sync with the video, give or take. However, this is the maximum drift of the audio synchronization; it is not compounded throughout the recording.

== Variants ==
Sony and Panasonic created their proprietary versions of DV aimed toward professional & broadcast users, which use the same compression scheme, but improve on robustness, linear editing capabilities, color rendition and raster size.

All DV variants except for DVCPRO Progressive are recorded to tape within interlaced video stream. Film-like frame rates are possible by using pulldown. DVCPRO HD supports native progressive format when recorded to P2 memory cards.

=== DVCPRO ===
DVCPRO compatibility mark

Diagram of DVCPRO tape track layout

DVCPRO, also known as DVCPRO25 and D-7, is a variation of DV developed by Panasonic and introduced in 1995, originally intended for use in electronic news gathering (ENG) equipment.

Unlike baseline DV, DVCPRO uses locked audio, meaning the audio sample clock runs in sync with the video sample clock. Audio is available in 16-bit/48 kHz precision.

When recorded to tape, DVCPRO uses wider track pitch—18 μm vs. 10 μm of baseline DV—which reduces the chance of dropout errors during recording. Two extra longitudinal tracks provide support for audio cue and for timecode control. Tape is transported 80% faster compared to baseline DV, resulting in shorter recording time. Long Play mode is not available.

==== DVCPRO50 ====
DVCPRO50 compatibility mark

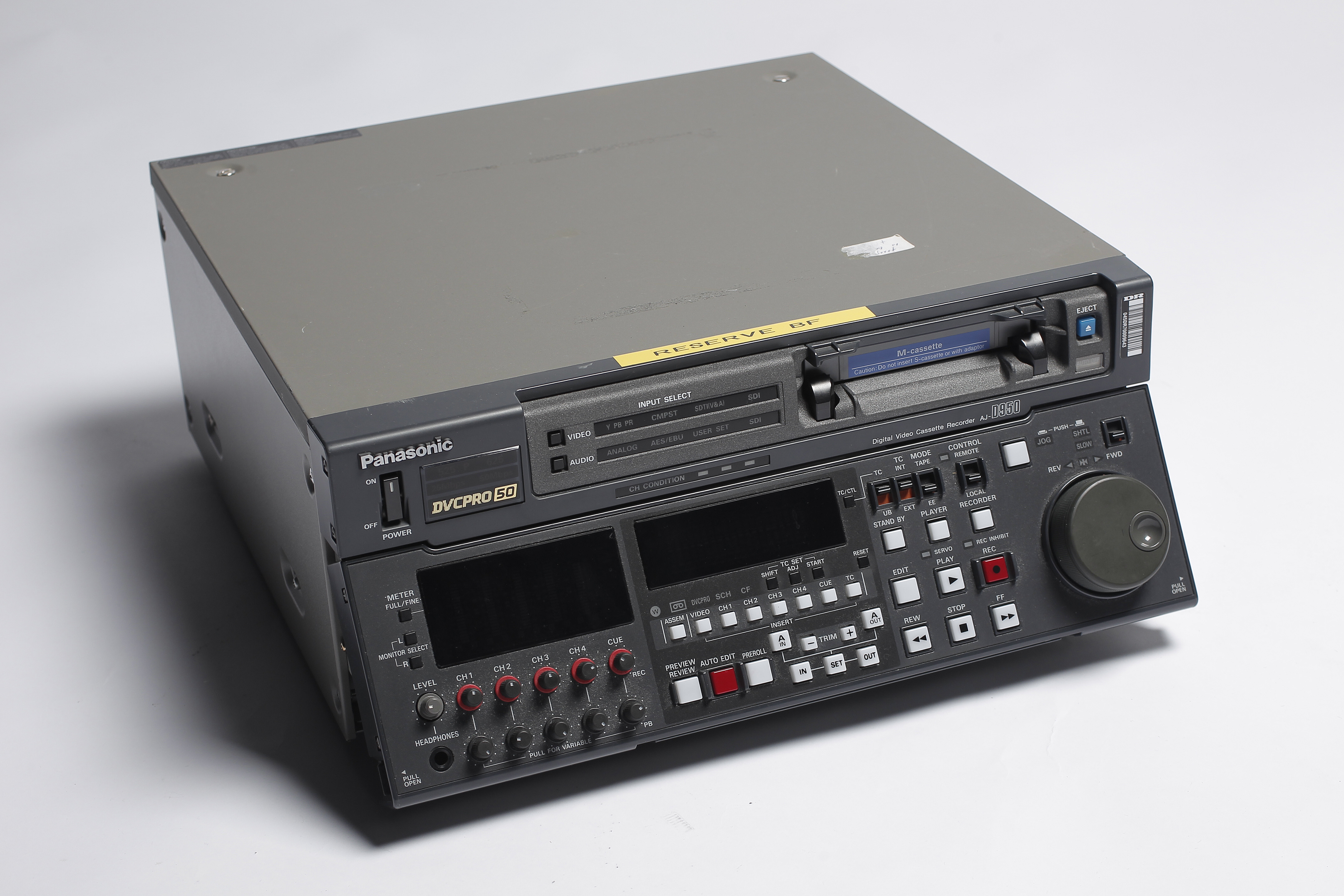
Panasonic AJ-D950 DVCPRO50 VCR

DVCPRO50 was introduced by Panasonic in 1997 and is often described as two DV codecs working in parallel.

The DVCPRO50 doubles the coded video data rate to 50 Mbit/s. This has the effect of cutting total record time of any given storage medium in half. Chroma resolution is improved by using 4:2:2 chroma subsampling.

A similar format, D-9 (or Digital-S), offered by JVC, uses videocassettes with the same form-factor as VHS.

Comparable high quality standard definition digital tape formats include Sony's Digital Betacam, introduced in 1993, and MPEG IMX, introduced in 2000.

==== DVCPRO Progressive ====
DVCPRO Progressive compatibility mark

DVCPRO Progressive was introduced by Panasonic alongside DVCPRO50. It offered 480 or 576 lines of progressive scan recording with 4:2:0 chroma subsampling and four 16-bit 48 kHz PCM audio channels. Like HDV-SD, it was meant as an intermediate format during the transition time from standard definition to high definition video.

The format offered six modes for recording and playback: 16:9 progressive (50 Mbit/s), 4:3 progressive (50 Mbit/s), 16:9 interlaced (50 Mbit/s), 4:3 interlaced (50 Mbit/s), 16:9 interlaced (25 Mbit/s), 4:3 interlaced (25 Mbit/s).

The format was superseded by DVCPRO HD.

==== DVCPRO HD ====
DVCPRO HD compatibility mark

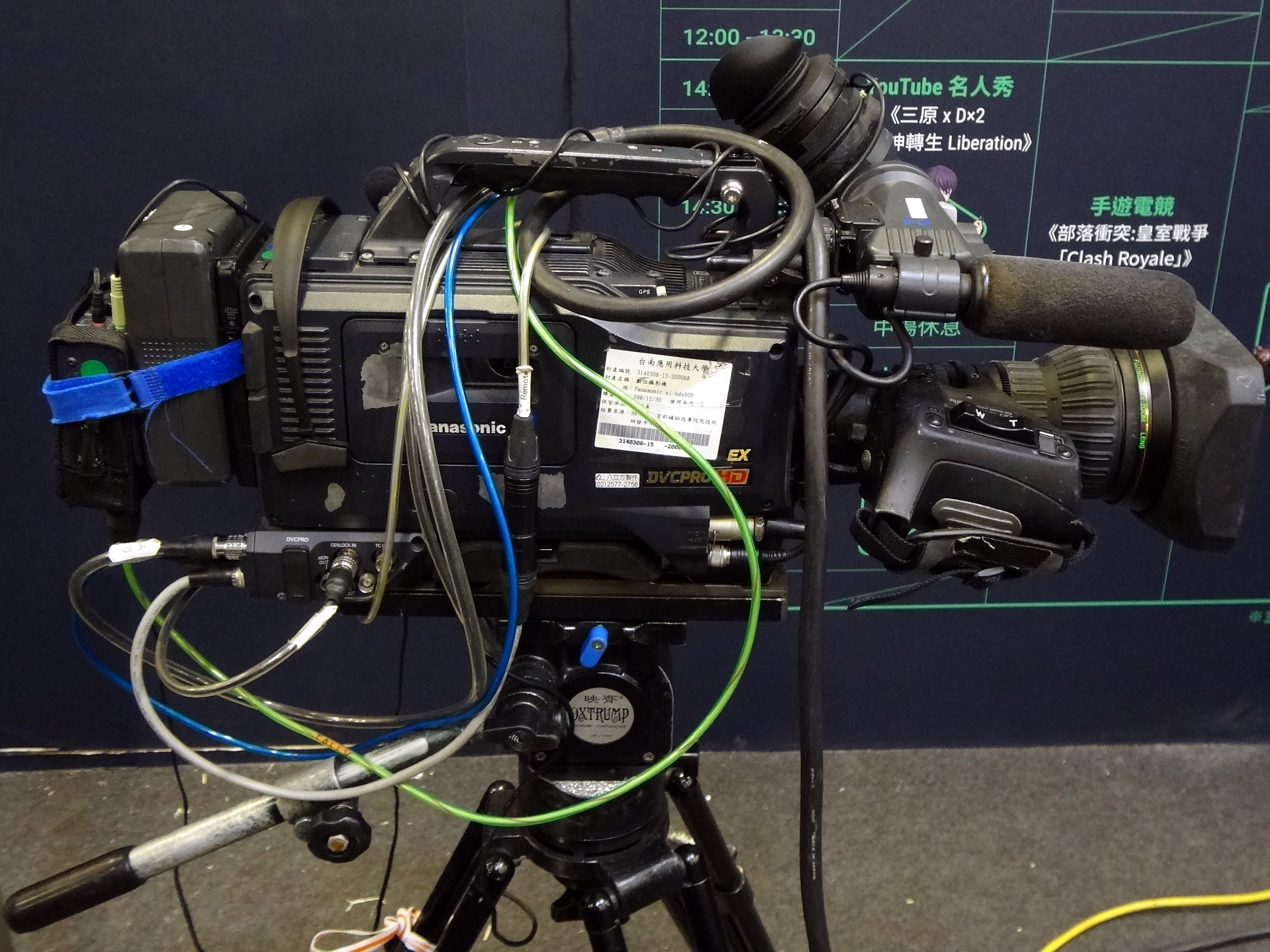
Panasonic AJ-HDX900 DVCPRO camcorder pictured in 2018

DVCPRO HD, also known as DVCPRO100 and D-12, is a high-definition video format that can be thought of as four DV codecs that work in parallel. Video data rate depends on frame rate and can be as low as 40 Mbit/s for 24 frame/s mode and as high as 100 Mbit/s for 50/60 frame/s modes. Like DVCPRO50, DVCPRO HD employs 4:2:2 color sampling. It was introduced in 2000.

DVCPRO HD uses smaller raster size than broadcast high definition television: 960 × 720 pixels for 720p, 1280 × 1080 for 1080/59.94i and 1440 × 1080 for 1080/50i. Similar horizontal downsampling (using rectangular pixels) is used in many other magnetic tape-based HD formats such as HDCAM. To maintain compatibility with HD-SDI, DVCPRO100 equipment upsamples video during playback.

Variable framerates (from 4 to 60 frame/s) are available on Varicam camcorders. DVCPRO HD equipment offers backward compatibility with older DV/DVCPRO formats.

When recorded to tape in standard-play mode, DVCPRO HD uses the same 18 μm track pitch as other DVCPRO flavors. A long play variant, DVCPRO HD-LP, doubles the recording density by using 9 μm track pitch.

DVCPRO HD is codified as SMPTE 370M; the DVCPRO HD tape format is SMPTE 371M, and the MXF Op-Atom format used for DVCPRO HD on P2 cards is SMPTE 390M.

While technically DVCPRO HD is a direct descendant of DV, it is used almost exclusively by professionals. Tape-based DVCPRO HD cameras exist only in shoulder mount variant.

A similar format, Digital-S (D-9 HD), was offered by JVC and used videocassettes with the same form-factor as VHS.

The main competitor to DVCPRO HD was HDCAM, offered by Sony. It uses a similar compression scheme but at higher bitrate.

=== DVCAM ===
DVCAM compatibility mark

In 1996, Sony responded with its own professional version of DV called DVCAM.

Like DVCPRO, DVCAM uses locked audio, which prevents audio synchronization drift that may happen on DV if several generations of copies are made.

When recorded to tape, DVCAM uses 15 μm track pitch, which is 50% wider compared to baseline. Accordingly, tape is transported 50% faster, which reduces recording time by one third compared to regular DV. Because of the wider track and track pitch, DVCAM has the ability to do a frame-accurate insert edit, while regular DV may vary by a few frames on each edit compared to the preview.

=== Digital8 ===
Digital8 is a combination of the tape transport originally designed for analog Video8 and Hi8 formats with the DV codec. Digital8 equipment records in DV format only, but usually can play back Video8 and Hi8 tapes as well.

=== Comparison of DV implementations ===
Feature	DV	DVCAM	DVCPRO	DVCPRO50	DIGITAL‑S	Digital8
Suppliers	Sony, Panasonic, JVC, Canon, Sharp and others	Sony, Ikegami	Panasonic; also Philips, Ikegami		JVC	Sony, Hitachi
Bit rate (Mbps)	25			50		25
Bit depth	luma: 8, chroma: 8					
525/60 subsampling	4:1:1			4:2:2		4:1:1
625/50 subsampling	4:2:0		4:1:1	4:2:2		4:2:0
525/60 frame size	720 × 480			720 × 487.5	720 × 480	
625/50 frame size	720 × 576			720 × 583.5	720 × 576	
Audio frequency (kHz)	32, 44.1, 48	32, 48 (44.1 nonpro mode)	48			32, 44.1, 48
Audio mode	Locked/unlocked		Locked			Locked/unlocked
Track pitch (μm)	10 (SP), 6.7 (LP)	15	18 (plays 10 and 15)		20	16.34
Tape speed (mm/s)	18.8	29.193	33.8	525: 67.640, 625: 67.708	57.737	28.666
Tracks per frame	525: 10, 625: 12			525: 20, 625: 24	?	25

== Recording media ==
=== Magnetic tape ===
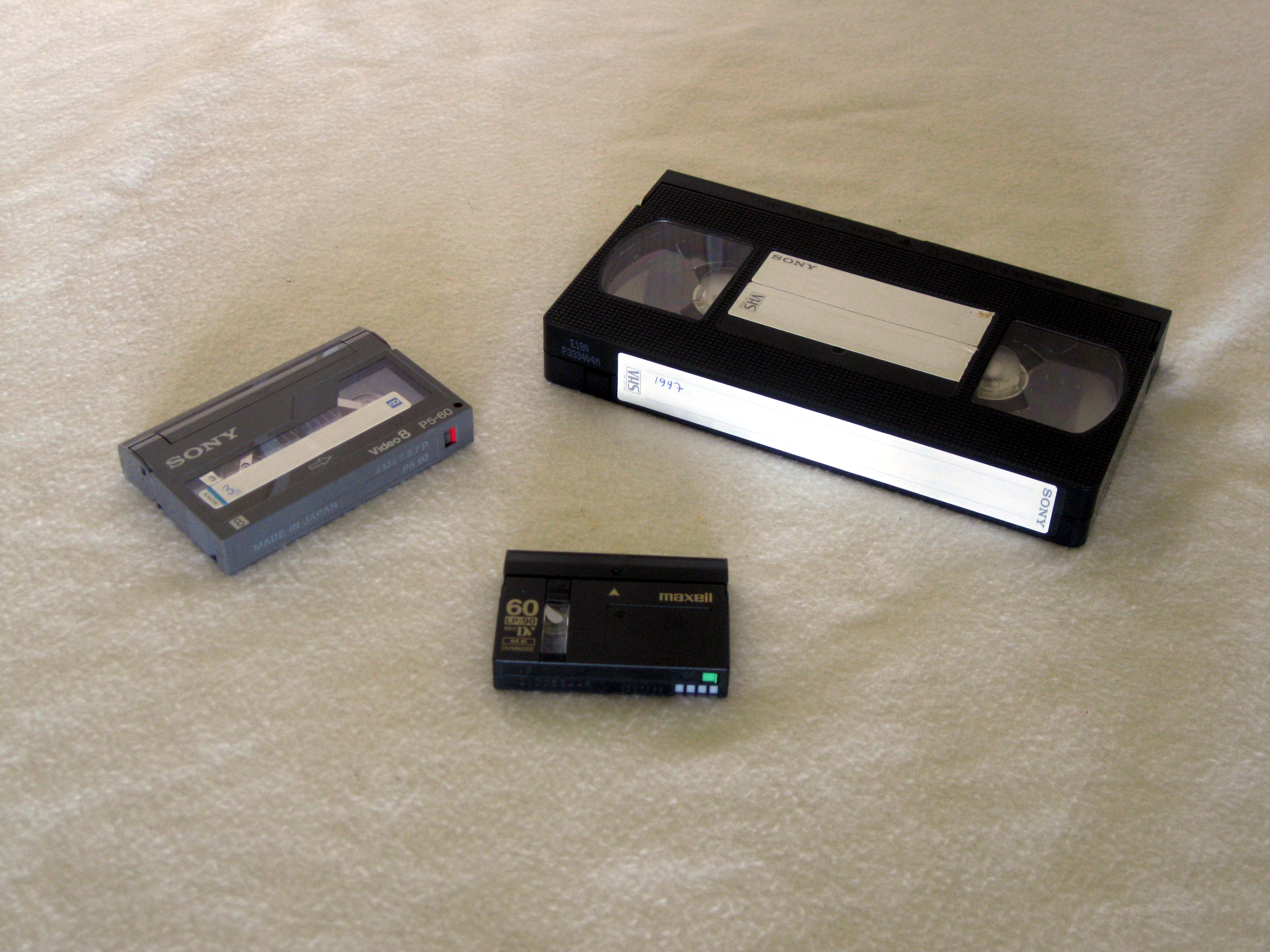
A MiniDV tape (centre) size comparison against a Video8 tape (left) and VHS tape (right)

The table below show the physical DV cassette formats at a glance:

Cassette formats	DV	DVCPRO	DVCAM
Small S-size / "MiniDV"	Yes	Only made MiniDV adapters	Yes
Medium M-size	-	Yes	-
Large L-size	Yes	Yes	Yes
Extra Large XL-size	-	Yes	-

DV was originally designed for recording onto magnetic tape. Tape is enclosed into videocassette of four different sizes: small, medium, large and extra-large. All DV cassettes use 1/4 inch (6.4 mm) wide tape. DV on magnetic tape uses helical scan, which wraps the tape around a tilted, rotating head drum with video heads mounted to it. As the drum rotates, the heads read the tape diagonally. DV, DVCAM and DVCPRO use a 21.7 mm diameter head drum at 9000 rpm. The diagonal video tracks read by the heads are 10 microns wide in DV tapes.

Technically, any DV cassette can record any variant of DV. Nevertheless, manufacturers often label cassettes with DV, DVCAM, DVCPRO, DVCPRO50 or DVCPRO HD and indicate recording time with regards to the label posted. Cassettes labeled as DV indicate recording time of baseline DV; another number can indicate recording time of Long Play DV. Cassettes labeled as DVCPRO have a yellow tape door and indicate recording time when DVCPRO25 is used; with DVCPRO50 the recording time is half, with DVCPRO HD it is a quarter. Cassettes labeled as DVCPRO50 have a blue tape door and indicate recording time when DVCPRO50 is used. Cassettes labeled as DVCPRO HD have a red tape door and indicate recording time when DVCPRO HD-LP format is used; a second number may be used for DVCPRO HD recording, which will be half as long.

Panasonic stipulated use of a particular magnetic-tape formulation—metal particle (MP)—as an inherent part of its DVCPRO family of formats. Regular DV tape uses Metal Evaporate (ME) formulation (which, as the name suggests, uses physical vapor deposition to deposit metal onto the tape), which was pioneered for use in Hi8 camcorders.

==== Small size (MiniDV) ====
MiniDV mark

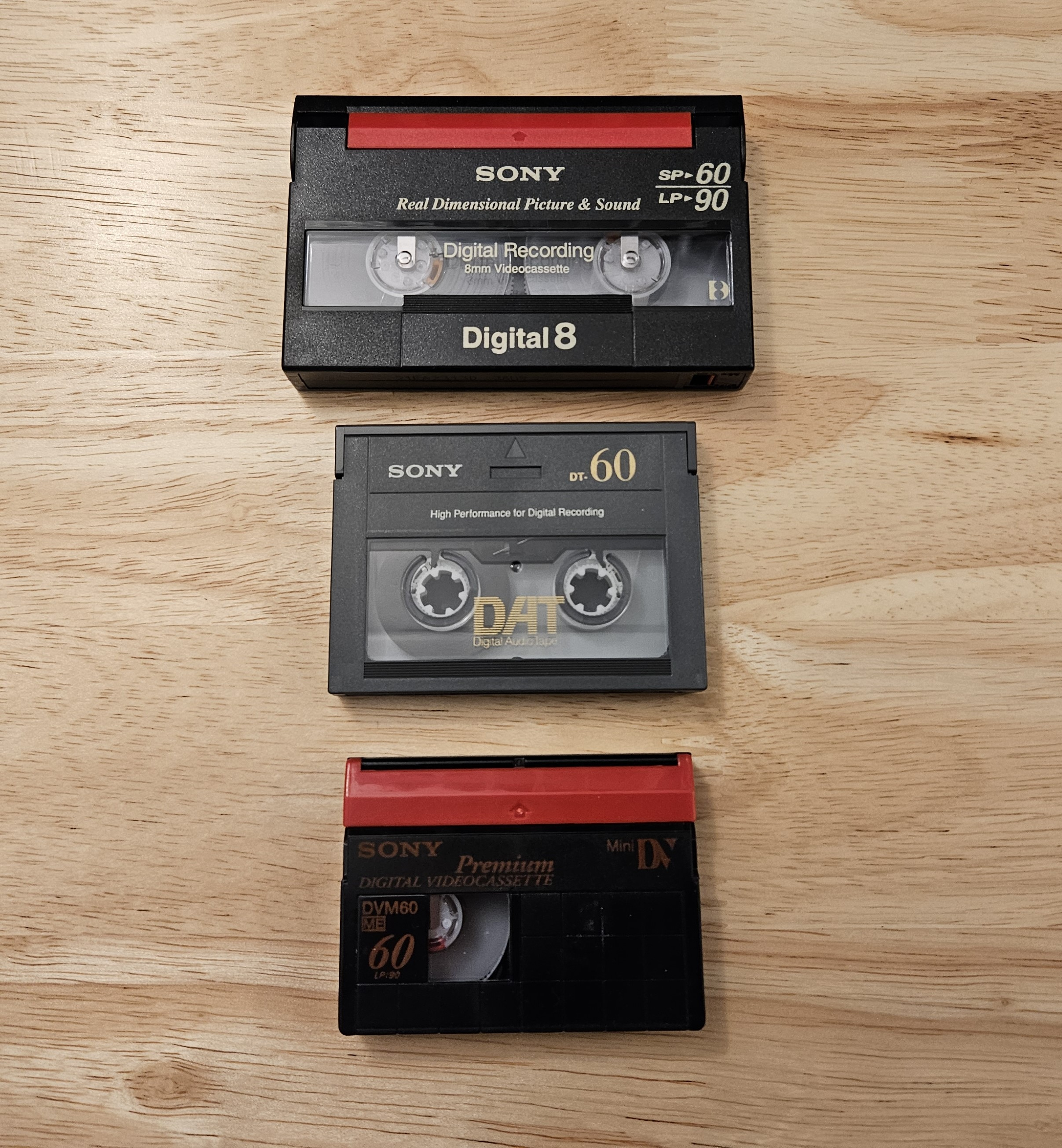
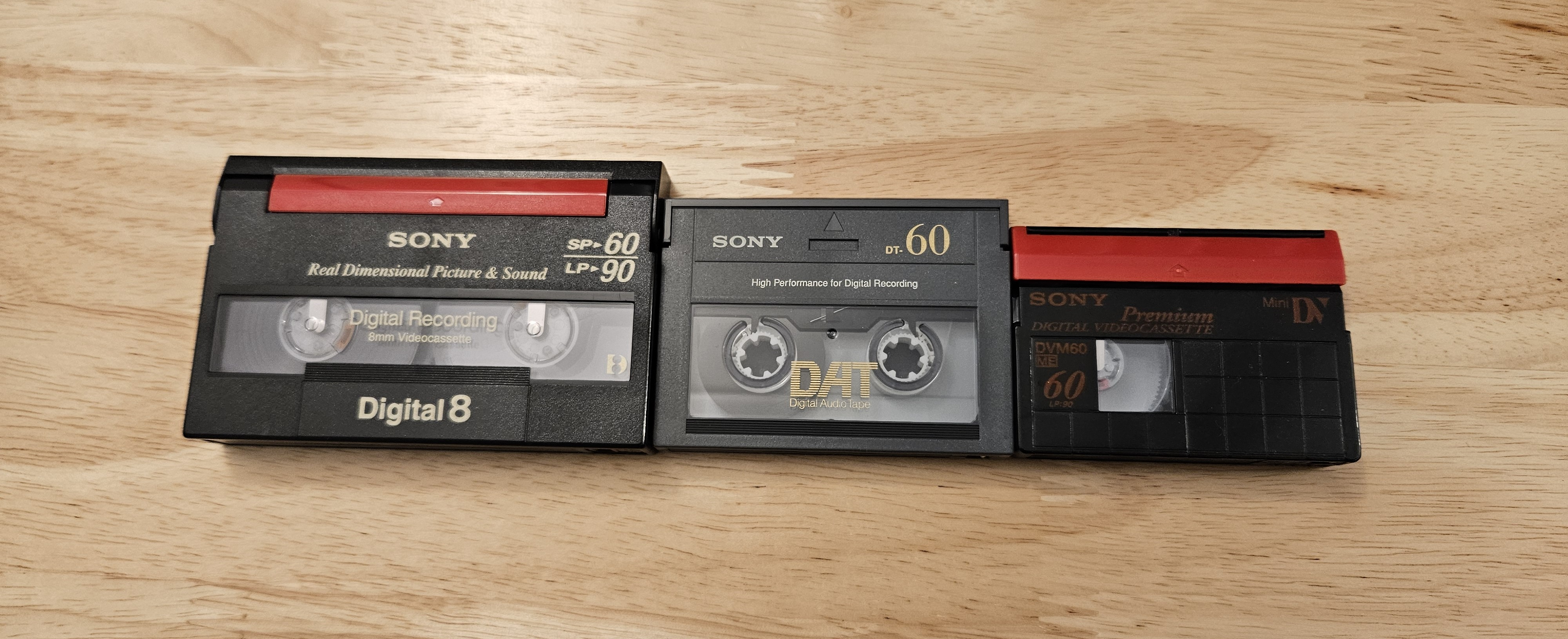
MiniDV compared to Digital8 and DAT

Small cassettes (66 × 48 × 12.2 mm), also known as S-size or MiniDV cassettes, had been intended for amateur use, but were accepted in professional productions as well. MiniDV cassettes were used for recording baseline DV, DVCAM, and HDV. These cassettes came in capacities up to 14–20.8 GB for 63 or 90 minutes of DV or HDV.

==== Medium size ====
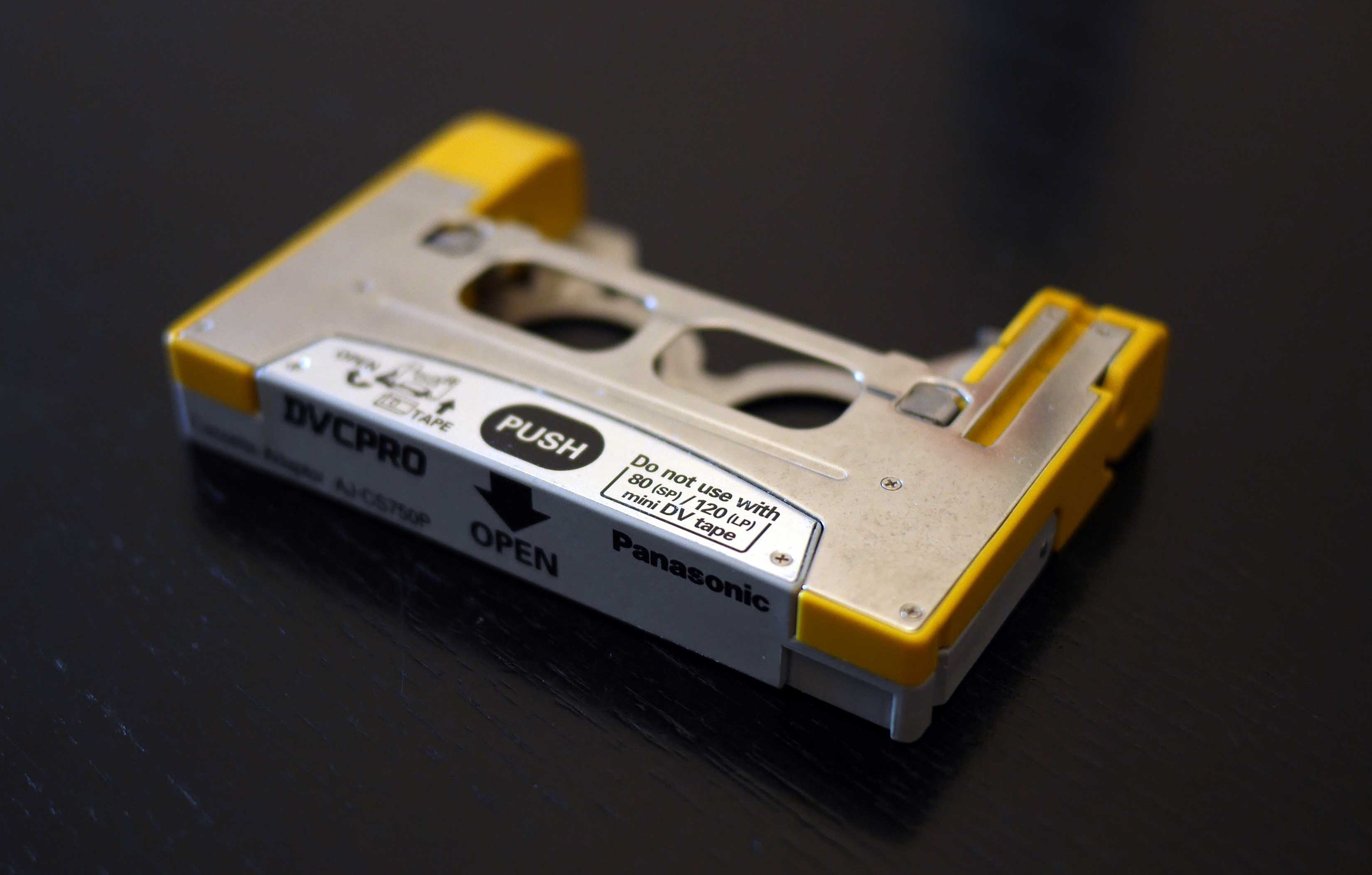
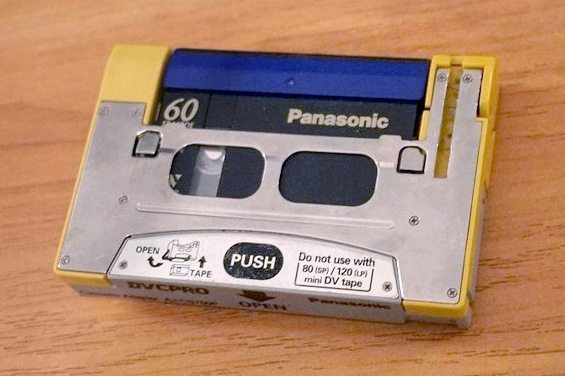
Adapter to place a MiniDV cassette to use with DVCPRO

Medium or M-size cassettes (97.5 × 64.5 × 14.6 mm), which are about the size of eight-millimeter cassettes, were used in professional Panasonic equipment and are often called DVCPRO tapes. Panasonic video recorders that accept medium cassette can play back from and record to medium cassette in different flavors of DVCPRO format.

==== Large size ====
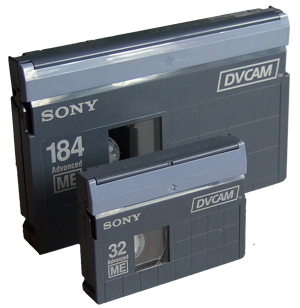
DVCAM cassettes in both miniDV and large size

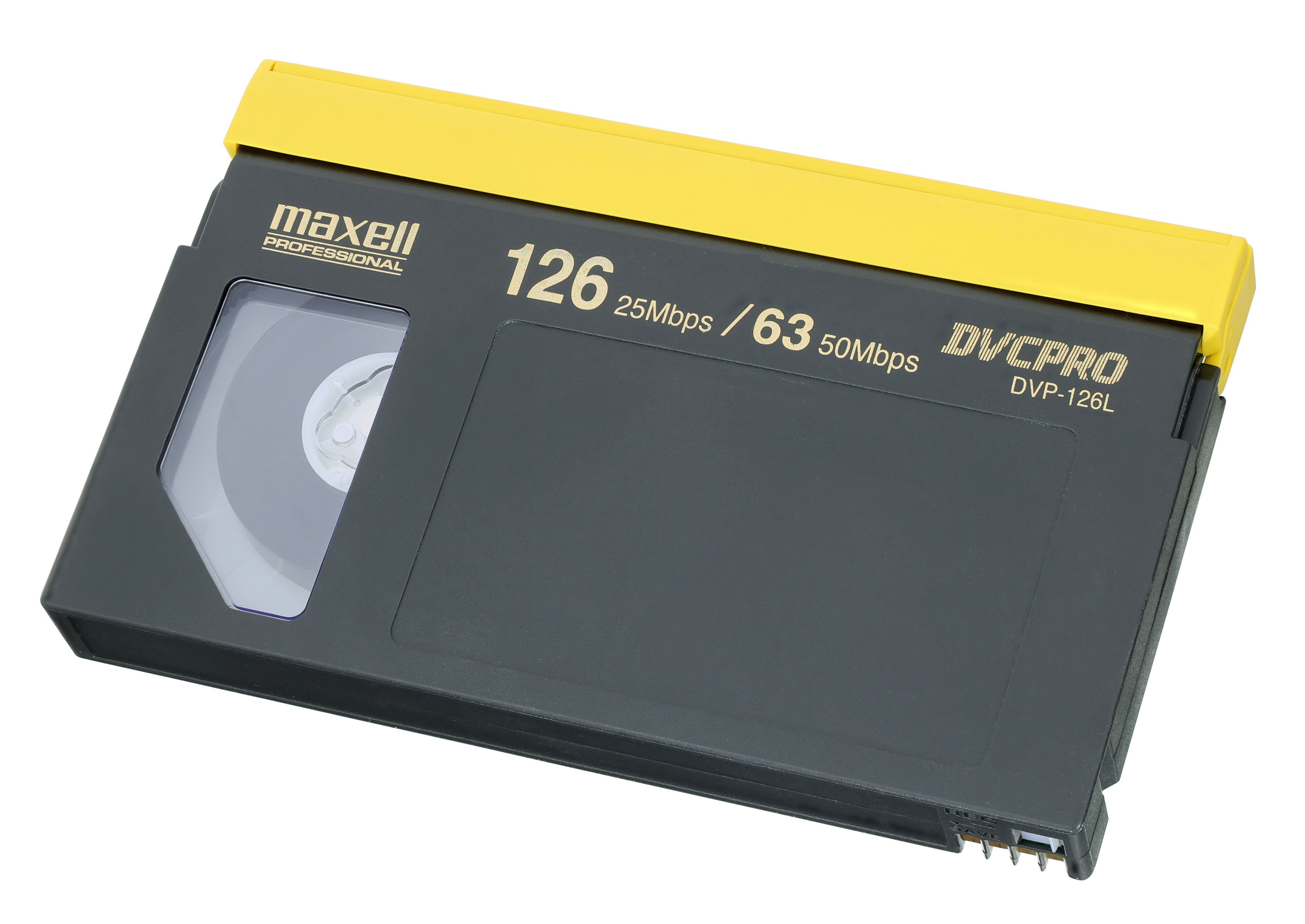
A 126-minute L-size Maxell DVCPRO cassette

Large or L-size cassettes (125.1 × 78 × 14.6 mm) are close in size to small MII cassettes and were accepted by most standalone DV tape recorders and were used in many shoulder-mount camcorders. The L-size cassette can be used in both Sony and Panasonic equipment; nevertheless, they are often called DVCAM tapes. Older Sony decks would not play large cassettes with DVCPRO recordings.

==== Extra-large size ====
Extra-large cassettes or XL-size (172 × 102 × 14.6 mm) are close in size to VHS cassettes and have been designed for use in Panasonic equipment and are sometimes called DVCPRO XL. These cassettes are not widespread, only a few models of Panasonic tape recorders can accept them.

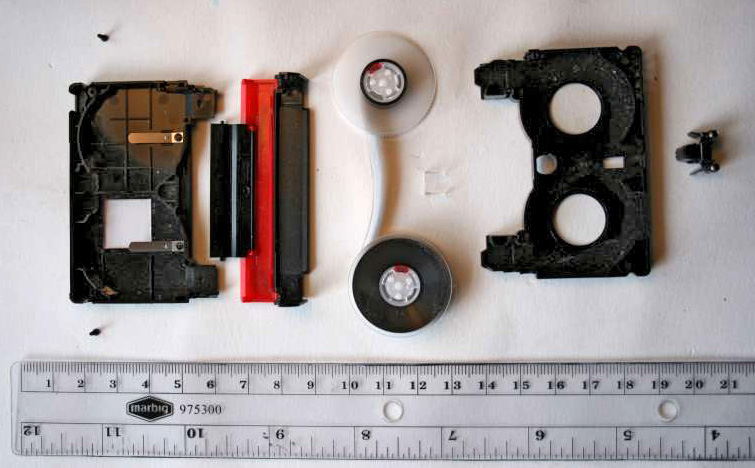
A disassembled MiniDV cassette

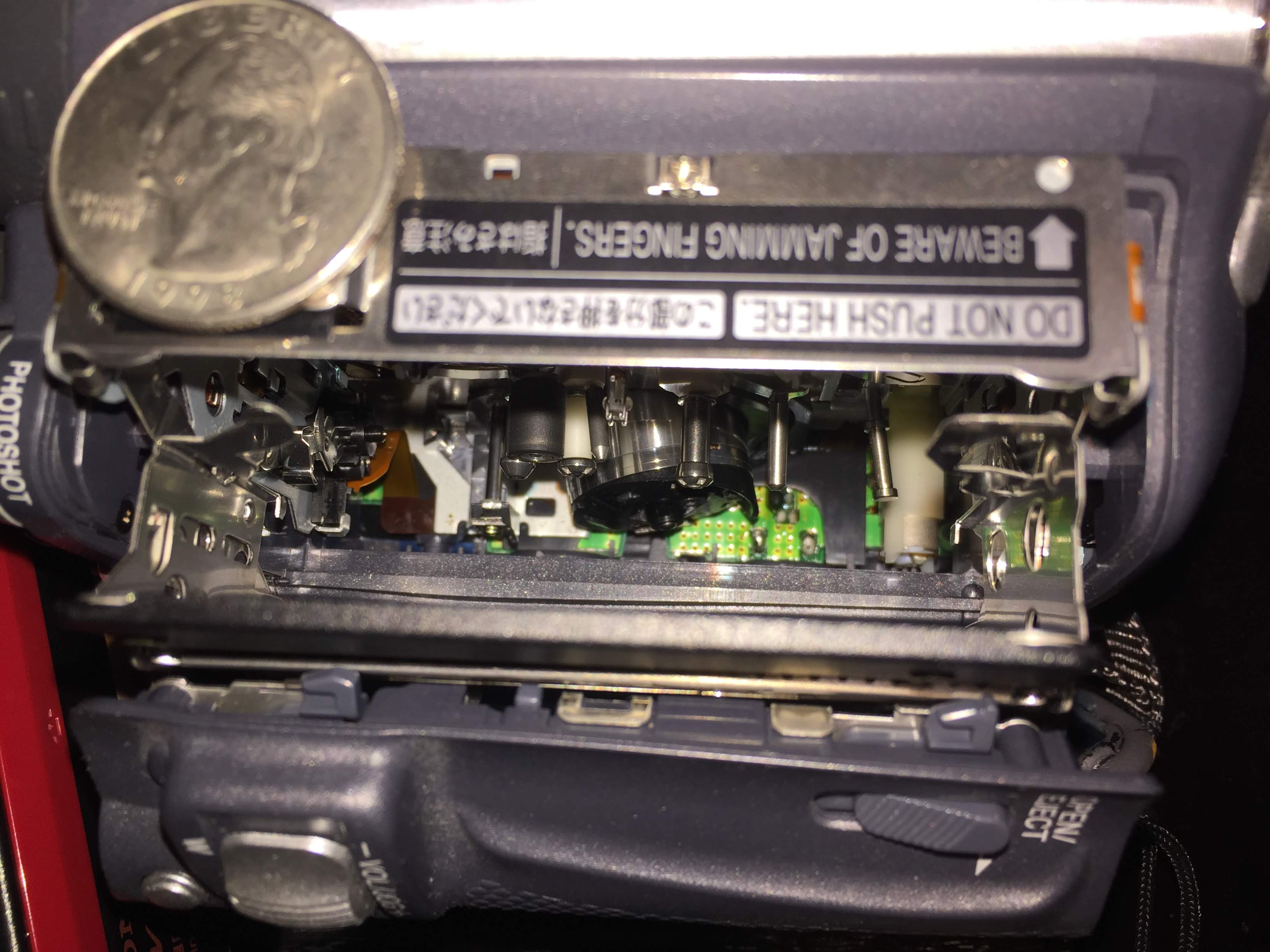
Mini-DV tape mechanism inside an early 2000s Panasonic Palmcorder. Quarter for scale.

=== File-based media ===
With proliferation of tapeless camcorder video recording, DV can be recorded on optical discs, solid state flash memory cards and hard disk drives and used as computer files. In particular:

- Sony XDCAM family of cameras can record DV onto either Professional Disc or SxS memory cards.
- Panasonic DVCPRO HD and AVC-Intra camcorders can record DV (as well as DVCPRO) onto P2 cards.
- Some Panasonic AVCHD camcorders (AG-HMC80, AG-AC130, AG-AC160) record DV onto Secure Digital memory cards.
- Most DV and HDV camcorders can feed live DV stream over IEEE 1394 interface to an external file-based recorder.

Video is stored either as native DIF bitstream or wrapped into an audio/video container such as AVI, QuickTime or MXF.

- DV-DIF is the raw form of DV. The files usually have extensions *.dv or *.dif.
- DV-AVI is Microsoft's implementation of DV file, which is wrapped into an AVI container. Two variants of wrapping are available: with Type 1 the multiplexed audio and video is saved into the video section of a single AVI file, with Type 2, video and audio are saved as separate streams in an AVI file (one video stream and one to four audio streams). This container is used primarily on Windows-based computers, though Sony offers two tapeless recorders, the HDD-based HVR-DR60 and the CompactFlash-based HVR-MRC1K, for use with DV/HDV camcorders that can record in DV-AVI format either making a file-based copy of the tape or bypassing tape recording altogether. Panasonic AVCHD camcorders use Type 2 DV-AVI for recording DV onto Secure Digital memory card.
- QuickTime-DV is DV wrapped into QuickTime container. This container is used primarily on Apple computers.
- MXF-DV wraps DV into MXF container, which is presently used on P2-based camcorders (Panasonic) and on XDCAM/XDCAM EX camcorders (Sony).

== Connectivity ==
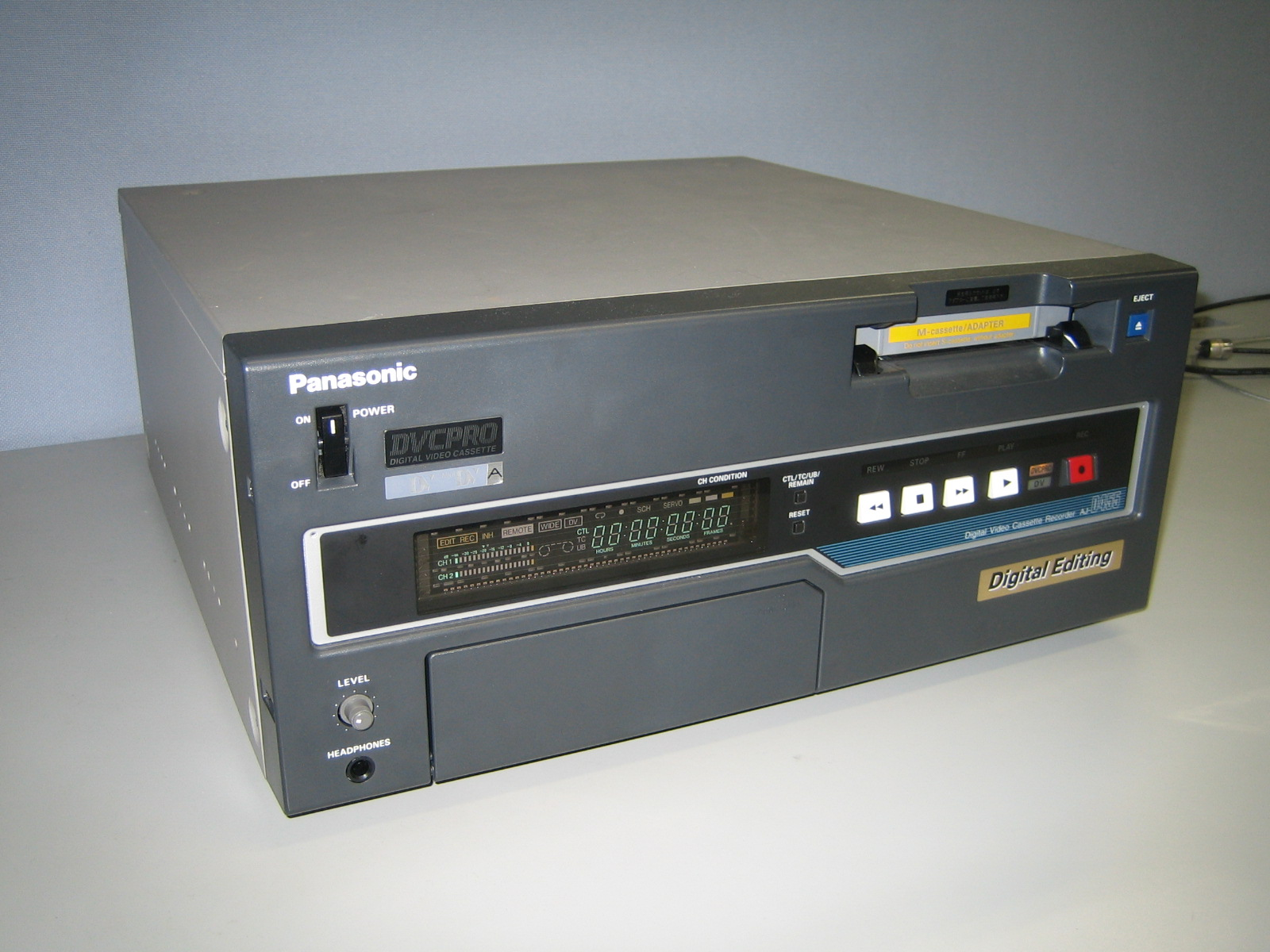
Panasonic AJ-D455 VCR for professional video use with IEEE 1394 port and DV capability

Nearly all DV camcorders and decks have IEEE 1394 (FireWire, i.LINK) ports for digital video transfer. This is usually a two-way port, so that DV data can be output to a computer (DV-out), or input from either a computer or another camcorder (DV-in). The DV-in capability makes it possible to copy edited DV from a computer back onto tape, or make a lossless copy between two mutually connected DV camcorders. However, models made for sale in the European Union usually had the DV-in capability disabled in the firmware by the manufacturer because the camcorder would be classified by the EU as a video recorder and would therefore attract higher duty; a model which only had DV-out could be sold at a lower price in the EU.

When video is captured onto a computer it is stored in a container file, which can be either raw DV stream, AVI, WMV or QuickTime. Whichever container is used, the video itself is not re-encoded and represents a complete digital copy of what has been recorded onto tape. If needed, the video can be recorded back to tape to create a full and lossless copy of the original footage.

Some camcorders also feature a USB 2.0 port for computer connection. This port is usually used for transferring still images, but not for video transfer. Camcorders that offer video transfer over USB usually do not deliver full DV quality; usually it is 320x240 video, except for the Sony DCR-PC1000 camcorder and some Panasonic camcorders that provide transfer of a full-quality DV stream via USB by using the UVC protocol. Full-quality DV can also be captured via USB or Thunderbolt by using separate hardware that receives DV data from the camcorder over a FireWire cable and forwards it without any transcoding to the computer via a USB cable or a Firewire to Thunderbolt adapter – this can be particularly useful for capturing on modern laptop computers which usually do not have a FireWire port or expansion slot but always have USB or Thunderbolt ports.

High end cameras and VTRs may have additional professional outputs such as SDI, SDTI or analog component video. All DV variants have a time code, but some older or consumer computer applications fail to take advantage of it.

== Usage ==
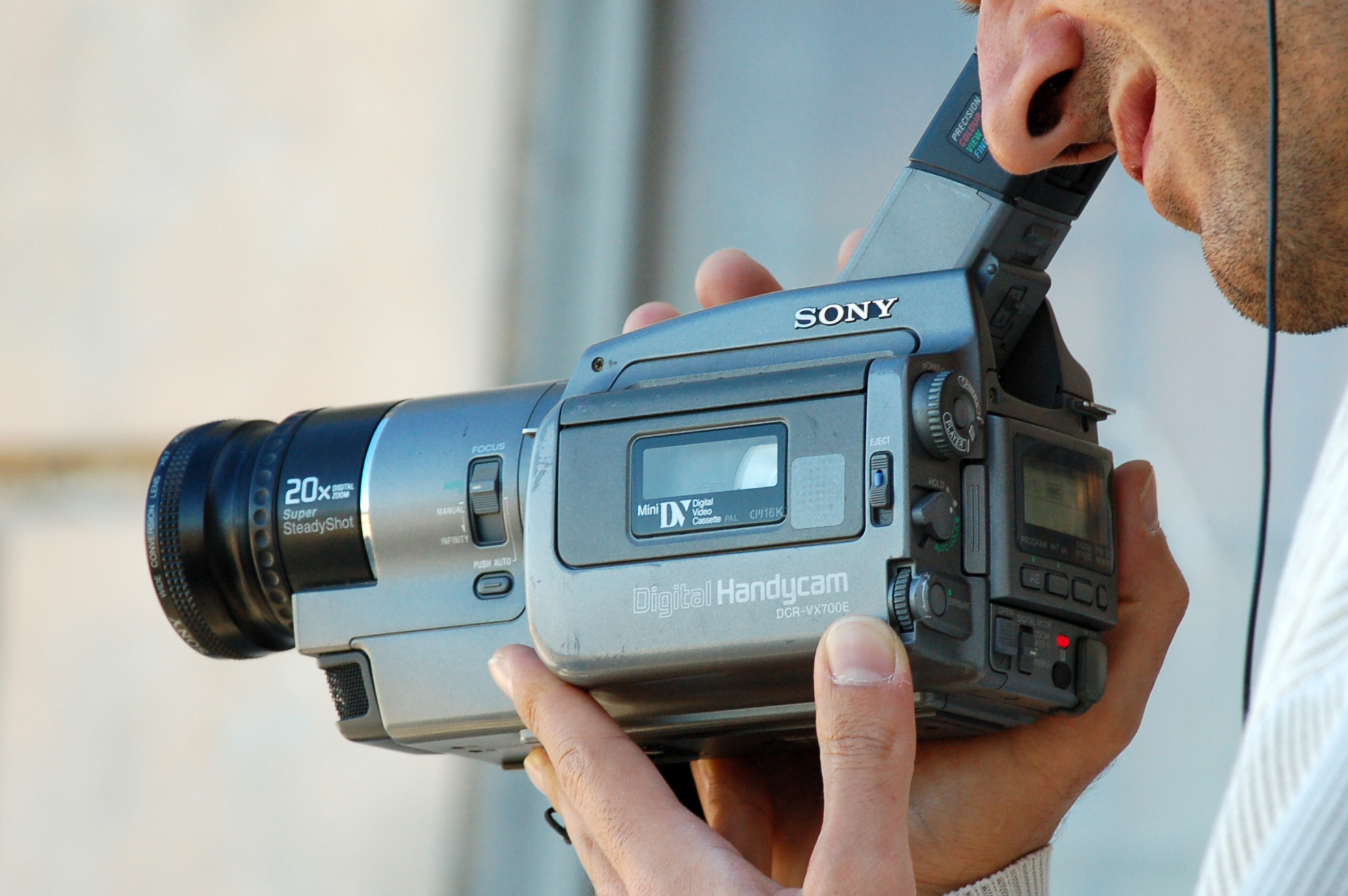
A consumer-grade Sony Handycam MiniDV camcorder

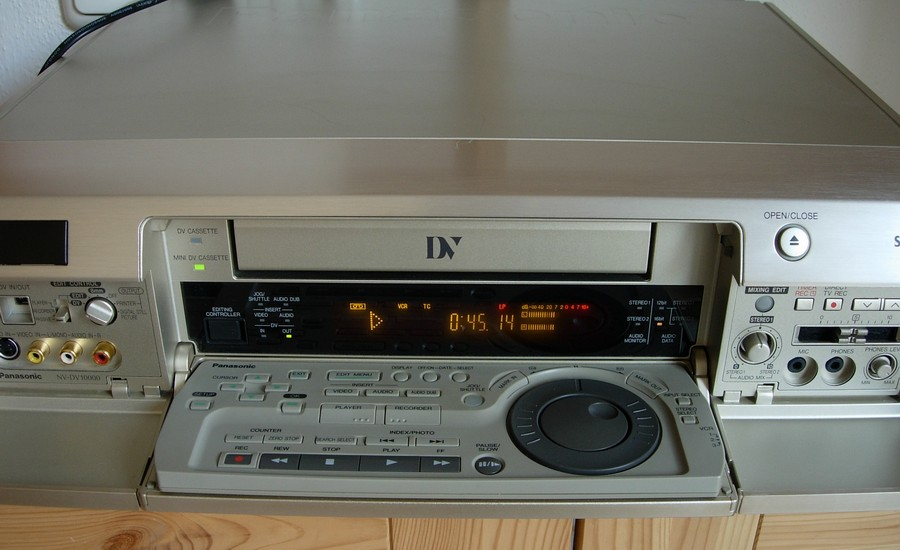
A Panasonic DV videorecorder (VCR)

=== Films ===
Notable films that were shot on the DV format include:

- Bamboozled (Spike Lee—2000)
- Waking Life (Richard Linklater—2001)
- 28 Days Later (Danny Boyle—2002)

== Tape formulation compatibility ==
It was suggested by some professionals that using tape from different manufacturers could lead to dropouts. This was mostly in regard to MiniDV tapes in the mid to late 90s as the only two manufacturers of MiniDV tapes—Sony, who produce their tapes solely under the Sony brand; and Panasonic, who produce their own tapes under their Panasonic brand and outsources for TDK, Canon, etc.—used two different lubrication types for their cameras.

Research undertaken by Sony found that there was no hard evidence of the above statement. The only evidence claimed was that using ME tapes in equipment designed for MP tapes can cause tape damage and hence dropouts. Sony has done a significant amount of internal testing to simulate head clogs as a result of mixing tape lubricants, and has been unable to recreate the problem. Sony recommends using cleaning cassettes once every 50 hours of recording or playback. For those who are still skeptical, Sony recommends cleaning video heads with a cleaning cassette before trying another brand of tape.

In 1999, Steve Epstein, technical editor of Broadcast Engineering magazine, received the following response from a Sony representative regarding tape stock compatibility:

Sony developed DVCAM based on the DV consumer format. The DV format was designed for use with metal evaporated tape, which offers approximately 5 dB better carrier-to-noise figures than metal particle tape. Customers have requested VTRs that can play additional DV-based 6 mm formats such as the consumer DV LP and DVCPRO. Sony will be offering new VTRs that can play back both of these additional formats without headclog and tape path issues.

It was realized early on that the VTR transport needed to be optimized to play various tape formulations and thicknesses. In addition, there is no need to dub DV LP or DVCPRO footage to another format for use as source material. This new VTR is the DSR 2000 DVCAM Studio recorder, and it is expected to be available later this year.

Robert Ott, Vice President for storage products and marketing, Sony Electronics, Park Ridge, New Jersey

== See also ==
- Common Intermediate Format – Standard format for digital video in teleconferencing
- Source Input Format – File format
- Video CD – CD-based format meant for digital video distribution
- Video journalism – Form of journalism, shot on video
