= Serial Data Transport Interface =

Serial Data Transport Interface is a way of transmitting data packets over a serial digital interface (SDI) datastream. This means that standard SDI infrastructure can be used.

Developed to address the needs of the growing number of compressed video standards (DV, DVCPRO, BetaSX, MPEG2) it allows lossless transfer of data to other devices which have the same codec, for example DV to DV or SX to SX.

Using a standard SDI transport, the extra data is placed within normal active video, between Start of Active Video (SAV), and End of Active Video (EAV). This gives 1440 10-bit words of data at 270 Mbit/s (1920 words in the 8-bit 360 Mbit/s standard).

If an SDTI stream is viewed using a standard SDI device, then the raw data can be seen as a small strip along the left-hand side (usually in purple). The DVCAM SDTI has video data at the top, control data in the middle (Timecode, etc.) and audio at the bottom just like it is organised on the tape.

Because SDTI is used for compressed data the area used is less than a full screen; this allows for faster-than-real-time transfers.

SDTI is standardized as SMPTE 305M. A 1.5 Gbit/s version, using the high definition serial digital interface, is standardized as SMPTE 348M.
