= SMPTE 356M =

SMPTE standard for professional video format

SMPTE 356M is a SMPTE specification for a professional video format, it is composed of MPEG-2 video composed of only I-frames and using 4:2:2 chroma subsampling. 8 channel AES3 audio streams are also included. These AES3 audio usually contain 24 bit PCM audio samples. SMPTE 356M requires up to 50 Mbit/s of bandwidth.

This format is described in the document SMPTE 356M-2001, "Type D-10 Stream Specifications — MPEG-2 4:2:2P @ ML for 525/60 and 625/50".

The technology specified in SMPTE 356M is also known as D10 or D-10 and also called IMX by Sony.
