= Chip description file =

Text file for describing microarrays

A Chip description file is a file that contains a possible annotation of a microarray chip type. The file typically specifies which probes map to the same genomic unit of interest. This mapping methodology solves the problem of a reliable reconstruction of expression levels as, if more than one probeset per gene exists, expression signals for the same transcript may be enhanced incorrectly.

Genomic units of interest may include: Expression, Genotyping, CustomSeq, Copy Number and/or Tag probe sets. All probe set names within an array are unique. Multiple copies of a probe set may exist on a single array as long as each copy has a unique name. CDFs exist for Gene expression (mapping sets of probes to genes), for genotyping (mapping set of probes to Single-nucleotide_polymorphisms and allele type. Different CDFs may exist for a single chip type: one CDF may be used to interrogate gene transcripts and another CDF to interrogate exons.

Initially, Affymetrix created the specification to describe the layout for an Affymetrix GeneChip array. Affymetrix still provides "official" CDFs for most of their chip types. In addition to these, various groups provide custom CDF files that are optimized for various genomic features. CDFs are typically updated when the genome annotation is updated.

== Format ==
A Chip Description file is divided up into sections. The start of each section is defined by a line containing a section name enclosed in square braces. The section names are:

- CDF
- Chip
- QCI (where I ranges from 1 to the number of QC probe sets
- UnitJ (where J is an internal index to uniquely distinguish probe sets)
- UnitJ_BlockK (where J and K are internal indices used to distinguish subsets of a probe set)

The data in each section is of the format TAG=VALUE.
