= Compound File Binary Format =

Compound document file format

Compound File Binary Format (CFBF), also called Compound File, Compound Document format, or Composite Document File V2 (CDF), is a compound document file format for storing numerous files and streams within a single file on a disk. CFBF is developed by Microsoft and is an implementation of Microsoft COM Structured Storage. The file format is used for storing storage objects and stream objects in a hierarchical structure within a single file.

Microsoft has opened the format for use by others and it is now used in a variety of programs from Microsoft Word and Microsoft Access to Business Objects. It also forms the basis of the Advanced Authoring Format.

== Overview ==
At its simplest, the Compound File Binary Format is a container, with little restriction on what can be stored within it.

A CFBF file structure loosely resembles a FAT file system. The file is partitioned into Sectors which are chained together with a File Allocation Table (not to be mistaken with the file system of the same name) which contains chains of sectors related to each file, a Directory holds information for contained files with a Sector ID (SID) for the starting sector of a chain and so on.

== Structure ==
The CFBF file consists of a 512-byte header record followed by a number of Sectors whose size is defined in the header. The literature defines Sectors to be either 512 or 4096 bytes in length, although the format is potentially capable of supporting sectors ranging in size from 128 bytes upwards, in powers of two (128, 256, 512, 1024, etc.). The lower limit of 128 is the minimum required to fit a single directory entry in a Directory Sector.

There are several types of sector that may be present in a CFBF file:

- File Allocation Table (FAT) Sector – contains chains of sector indices much as a FAT does in the FAT/FAT32 filesystems
- MiniFAT Sectors – similar to the FAT but storing chains of mini-sectors within the Mini-Stream
- Double-Indirect FAT (DIFAT) Sector – contains chains of FAT sector indices
- Directory Sector – contains directory entries
- Stream Sector – contains arbitrary file data
- Range Lock Sector – contains the byte-range locking area of a large file

More detail is given below for the header and each sector type.

=== CFBF header format ===
The CFBF header occupies the first 512 bytes of the file and information required to interpret the rest of the file. The C-style structure declaration below (extracted from the AAFA's Low-Level Container Specification) shows the members of the CFBF header and their purpose:

typedef unsigned long ULONG;    // 4 bytes
typedef unsigned short USHORT;  // 2 bytes
typedef short OFFSET;           // 2 bytes
typedef ULONG SECT;             // 4 bytes
typedef ULONG FSINDEX;          // 4 bytes
typedef USHORT FSOFFSET;        // 2 bytes
typedef USHORT WCHAR;           // 2 bytes
typedef ULONG DFSIGNATURE;      // 4 bytes
typedef unsigned char BYTE;     // 1 byte
typedef unsigned short WORD;    // 2 bytes
typedef unsigned long DWORD;    // 4 bytes
typedef ULONG SID;              // 4 bytes
typedef GUID CLSID;             // 16 bytes

struct StructuredStorageHeader { // [offset from start (bytes), length (bytes)]
    BYTE _abSig[8];             // [00H,08] {0xd0, 0xcf, 0x11, 0xe0, 0xa1, 0xb1,
                                // 0x1a, 0xe1} for current version
    CLSID _clsid;               // [08H,16] reserved must be zero (WriteClassStg/
                                // GetClassFile uses root directory class id)
    USHORT _uMinorVersion;      // [18H,02] minor version of the format: 33 is
                                // written by reference implementation
    USHORT _uDllVersion;        // [1AH,02] major version of the dll/format: 3 for
                                // 512-byte sectors, 4 for 4 KB sectors
    USHORT _uByteOrder;         // [1CH,02] 0xFFFE: indicates Intel byte-ordering
    USHORT _uSectorShift;       // [1EH,02] size of sectors in power-of-two;
                                // typically 9 indicating 512-byte sectors
    USHORT _uMiniSectorShift;   // [20H,02] size of mini-sectors in power-of-two;
                                // typically 6 indicating 64-byte mini-sectors
    USHORT _usReserved;         // [22H,02] reserved, must be zero
    ULONG _ulReserved1;         // [24H,04] reserved, must be zero
    FSINDEX _csectDir;          // [28H,04] must be zero for 512-byte sectors,
                                // number of SECTs in directory chain for 4 KB
                                // sectors
    FSINDEX _csectFat;          // [2CH,04] number of SECTs in the FAT chain
    SECT _sectDirStart;         // [30H,04] first SECT in the directory chain
    DFSIGNATURE _signature;     // [34H,04] signature used for transactions; must
                                // be zero. The reference implementation
                                // does not support transactions
    ULONG _ulMiniSectorCutoff;  // [38H,04] maximum size for a mini stream;
                                // typically 4096 bytes
    SECT _sectMiniFatStart;     // [3CH,04] first SECT in the MiniFAT chain
    FSINDEX _csectMiniFat;      // [40H,04] number of SECTs in the MiniFAT chain
    SECT _sectDifStart;         // [44H,04] first SECT in the DIFAT chain
    FSINDEX _csectDif;          // [48H,04] number of SECTs in the DIFAT chain
    SECT _sectFat[109];         // [4CH,436] the SECTs of first 109 FAT sectors
 };

The first 4 bytes of the signature (0xD0CF11E0) visually resemble the letters "DOCFILE".

=== File Allocation Table (FAT) sectors ===
When taken together as a single stream the collection of FAT sectors define the status and linkage of every sector in the file. Each entry in the FAT is 4 bytes in length and contains the sector number of the next sector in a FAT chain or one of the following special values:

- FREESECT (0xFFFFFFFF) – denotes an unused sector
- ENDOFCHAIN (0xFFFFFFFE) – marks the last sector in a FAT chain
- FATSECT (0xFFFFFFFD) – marks a sector used to store part of the FAT
- DIFSECT (0xFFFFFFFC) – marks a sector used to store part of the DIFAT

=== Range Lock Sector ===
The Range Lock Sector must exist in files greater than 2 GB in size, and must not exist in files smaller than 2 GB. The Range Lock Sector must contain the byte range 0x7FFFFF00 to 0x7FFFFFFF in the file. This area is reserved by Microsoft's COM implementation for storing byte-range locking information for concurrent access.

=== Glossary ===
- FAT – File Allocation Table; also known as SAT – Sector Allocation Table
- DIFAT – Double-Indirect File Allocation Table
- FAT Chain – a group of FAT entries which indicate the Sectors allocated to a Stream in the file
- Stream – a virtual file which occupies a number of Sectors within the CFBF
- Sector – the unit of allocation within the CFBF, usually 512 or 4096 Bytes in length

== See also ==
- COM Structured Storage
- Advanced Authoring Format (AAF)
- Cabinet (file format)
