= List of file signatures =

A file signature is data used to identify or verify the content of a file. Such signatures are also known as magic numbers or magic bytes and are usually inserted at the beginning of the file.

Many file formats are not intended to be read as text. If such a file is accidentally viewed as a text file, its contents will be unintelligible. However, some file signatures can be recognizable when interpreted as text. In the table below, how the file signature appears when interpreted as text in the common ISO/IEC 8859-1 encoding is shown, with unprintable characters represented as the control code abbreviation or symbol, or codepage 1252 character where available, or a box otherwise. In some cases the space character is shown as ␠.

Hex signature	ISO/IEC 8859-1	Offset	Extension	Description
23 21	#!	0		Script or data to be passed to the program following the shebang (#!)
02 00 5a 57 52 54 00 00 00 00 00 00 00 00 00 00	␂␀ZWRT␀␀␀␀␀␀␀␀␀␀	0	cwk	Claris Works word processing doc
00 00 02 00 06 04 06 00 08 00 00 00 00 00	␀␀␂␀␆␄␆␀␈␀␀␀␀␀	0	wk1	Lotus 1-2-3 spreadsheet (v1) file
00 00 1A 00 00 10 04 00 00 00 00 00	␀␀␚␀␀␊␄␀␀␀␀␀	0	wk3	Lotus 1-2-3 spreadsheet (v3) file
00 00 1A 00 02 10 04 00 00 00 00 00	␀␀␚␀␂␊␄␀␀␀␀␀	0	wk4 wk5	Lotus 1-2-3 spreadsheet (v4, v5) file
00 00 1A 00 05 10 04	␀␀␚␀␅␊␄	0	123	Lotus 1-2-3 spreadsheet (v9) file
00 00 03 F3	␀␀␃ó	0		Amiga Hunk executable file
00 00 49 49 58 50 52 (little-endian); 00 00 4D 4D 58 50 52 (big-endian)	␀␀IIXPR ␀␀MMXPR	0	qxd	Quark Express document
50 57 53 33	PWS3	0	psafe3	Password Gorilla Password Database
D4 C3 B2 A1 (little-endian)	ÔÃ²¡	0	pcap	Libpcap File Format
A1 B2 C3 D4 (big-endian)	¡²ÃÔ	0	pcap	Libpcap File Format
4D 3C B2 A1 (little-endian)	M<²¡	0	pcap	Libpcap File Format (nanosecond-resolution)
A1 B2 3C 4D (big-endian)	¡²<M	0	pcap	Libpcap File Format (nanosecond-resolution)
0A 0D 0D 0A	␊␍␍␊	0	pcapng	PCAP Next Generation Dump File Format
ED AB EE DB	í«îÛ	0	rpm	RedHat Package Manager (RPM) package
53 51 4C 69 74 65 20 66; 6F 72 6D 61 74 20 33 00	SQLite format 3␀	0	sqlitedb sqlite db	SQLite Database
53 50 30 31	SP01	0	bin	Amazon Kindle Update Package
49 57 41 44	IWAD	0	wad	internal WAD (main resource file of Doom)
00	␀	0	PIC; PIF; SEA; YTR	IBM Storyboard bitmap file Windows Program Information File; Mac Stuffit Self-Extracting Archive; IRIS OCR data file
00 00 00 00 00 00 00 00; 00 00 00 00 00 00 00 00; 00 00 00 00 00 00 00 00	␀␀␀␀␀␀␀␀ ␀␀␀␀␀␀␀␀ ␀␀␀␀␀␀␀␀	11	PDB	PalmPilot Database/Document File
BE BA FE CA	¾ºþÊ	0	DBA	Palm Desktop Calendar Archive
00 01 42 44	␀␁BD	0	DBA	Palm Desktop To Do Archive
00 01 44 54	␀␁DT	0	TDA	Palm Desktop Calendar Archive
54 44 46 24	TDF$	0	TDF$	Telegram Desktop File
54 44 45 46	TDEF	0	TDEF	Telegram Desktop Encrypted File
00 01 00 00	␀␁␀␀	0		Palm Desktop Data File (Access format)
00 00 01 00	␀␀␁␀	0	ico	Computer icon encoded in ICO file format
69 63 6e 73	icns	0	icns	Apple Icon Image format
66 74 79 70 33 67	ftyp3g	4	3gp 3g2	3rd Generation Partnership Project 3GPP and 3GPP2 multimedia files
66 74 79 70 68 65 69 6366 74 79 70 6d	ftypheic	4	heic	High Efficiency Image Container (HEIC)
1F 9D	␟□	0	z tar.z	compressed file (often tar zip) using Lempel-Ziv-Welch algorithm
1F A0	␟⍽	0	z tar.z	Compressed file (often tar zip) using LZH algorithm
2D 6C 68 30 2D	-lh0-	2	lzh	Lempel Ziv Huffman archive file Method 0 (No compression)
2D 6C 68 35 2D	-lh5-	2	lzh	Lempel Ziv Huffman archive file Method 5 (8 KiB sliding window)
42 41 43 4B 4D 49 4B 45; 44 49 53 4B	BACKMIKEDISK	0	bac	AmiBack Amiga Backup data file
49 4E 44 58	INDX	0	idx	AmiBack Amiga Backup index file
62 70 6C 69 73 74	bplist	0	plist	Binary Property List file
42 5A 68	BZh	0	bz2	Compressed file using Bzip2 algorithm
47 49 46 38 37 61; 47 49 46 38 39 61	GIF87a; GIF89a	0	gif	Image file encoded in the Graphics Interchange Format (GIF)
49 49 2A 00 (little-endian)	II*␀	0	tif tiff	Tagged Image File Format (TIFF)
4D 4D 00 2A (big-endian)	MM␀*	0	tif tiff	Tagged Image File Format (TIFF)
49 49 2B 00 (little-endian)	II+␀	0	tif tiff	BigTIFF
4D 4D 00 2B (big-endian)	MM␀+	0	tif tiff	BigTIFF
49 49 2A 00 10 00 00 00; 43 52	II*␀␐␀␀␀CR	0	cr2	Canon RAW Format Version 2 Canon's RAW format is based on TIFF.
66 74 79 70 63 72 78; 43 52	ftypcrx	0	cr3	
80 2A 5F D7	€*_×	0	cin	Kodak Cineon image
52 4E 43 01; 52 4E 43 02	RNC␁ RNC␂	0		Compressed file using Rob Northen Compression (version 1 and 2) algorithm
4E 55 52 55 49 4D 47; 4E 55 52 55 50 41 4C	NURUIMG; NURUPAL	0	nui nup	nuru ASCII/ANSI image and palette files
53 44 50 58 (big-endian format)	SDPX	0	dpx	SMPTE DPX image
58 50 44 53 (little-endian format)	XPDS	0	dpx	SMPTE DPX image
76 2F 31 01	v/1␁	0	exr	OpenEXR image
42 50 47 FB	BPGû	0	bpg	Better Portable Graphics format
FF D8 FF DB	ÿØÿÛ	0	jpg jpeg	JPEG raw or in the JFIF or Exif file format
FF D8 FF E0 00 10 4A 46; 49 46 00 01	ÿØÿà␀␐JFIF␀␁	0	jpg jpeg	JPEG raw or in the JFIF or Exif file format
FF D8 FF EE	ÿØÿî	0	jpg jpeg	JPEG raw or in the JFIF or Exif file format
FF D8 FF E1 ?? ?? 45 78; 69 66 00 00	ÿØÿá??Exif␀␀	0	jpg jpeg	JPEG raw or in the JFIF or Exif file format
FF D8 FF E0	ÿØÿà	0	jpg	JPEG raw or in the JFIF or Exif file format
00 00 00 0C 6A 50 20 20 0D 0A 87 0A	␀␀␀␌jP␠␠␍␊‡␊	0	jp2 j2k jpf jpm jpg2 j2c jpc jpx mj2	JPEG 2000 format
FF 4F FF 51	ÿOÿQ	0	jp2 j2k jpf jpm jpg2 j2c jpc jpx mj2	JPEG 2000 format
71 6F 69 66	qoif	0	qoi	QOI - The “Quite OK Image Format”
46 4F 52 4D ?? ?? ?? ?? 49 4C 42 4D	FORM????ILBM	0 any	ilbm lbm ibm iff	IFF Interleaved Bitmap Image
46 4F 52 4D ?? ?? ?? ?? 38 53 56 58	FORM????8SVX	0 any	8svx 8sv svx snd iff	IFF 8-Bit Sampled Voice
46 4F 52 4D ?? ?? ?? ?? 41 43 42 4D	FORM????ACBM	0 any	acbm iff	Amiga Contiguous Bitmap
46 4F 52 4D ?? ?? ?? ?? 41 4E 42 4D	FORM????ANBM	0 any	anbm iff	IFF Animated Bitmap
46 4F 52 4D ?? ?? ?? ?? 41 4E 49 4D	FORM????ANIM	0 any	anim iff	IFF CEL Animation
46 4F 52 4D ?? ?? ?? ?? 46 41 58 58	FORM????FAXX	0 any	faxx fax iff	IFF Facsimile Image
46 4F 52 4D ?? ?? ?? ?? 46 54 58 54	FORM????FTXT	0 any	ftxt iff	IFF Formatted Text
46 4F 52 4D ?? ?? ?? ?? 53 4D 55 53	FORM????SMUS	0 any	smus smu mus iff	IFF Simple Musical Score
46 4F 52 4D ?? ?? ?? ?? 43 4D 55 53	FORM????CMUS	0 any	cmus mus iff	IFF Musical Score
46 4F 52 4D ?? ?? ?? ?? 59 55 56 4E	FORM????YUVN	0 any	yuvn yuv iff	IFF YUV Image
46 4F 52 4D ?? ?? ?? ?? 46 41 4E 54	FORM????FANT	0 any	iff	Amiga Fantavision Movie
46 4F 52 4D ?? ?? ?? ?? 41 49 46 46	FORM????AIFF	0 any	aiff aif aifc snd iff	Audio Interchange File Format
4C 5A 49 50	LZIP	0	lz	lzip compressed file
30 37 30 37 30 31	070701	0	cpio	cpio "new" ASCII archive file
30 37 30 37 30 32	070702	0	cpio	cpio ASCII archive file with crc
30 37 30 37 30 37	070707	0	cpio	cpio ASCII archive file
4D 5A	MZ	0	exe dll mui sys scr cpl ocx ax iec ime rs tsp fon efi	DOS MZ executable and its descendants (including NE and PE)
53 4D 53 4E 46 32 30 30	SMSNF200	0	ssp	SmartSniff Packets File
5A 4D	ZM	0	exe	DOS ZM executable and its descendants (rare)
50 4B 03 04; 50 4B 05 06 (empty archive); 50 4B 07 08 (spanned archive)	PK␃␄ PK␅␆ PK␇␈	0	zip aar apk docx epub ipa jar kmz maff msix odp ods odt pk3 pk4 pptx usdz vsdx xlsx xpi whl	zip file format and formats based on it, such as EPUB, JAR, ODF, OOXML
52 61 72 21 1A 07 00	Rar!␚␇␀	0	rar	Roshal ARchive compressed archive v1.50 onwards
52 61 72 21 1A 07 01 00	Rar!␚␇␁␀	0	rar	Roshal ARchive compressed archive v5.00 onwards
7F 45 4C 46	␡ELF	0	none, .axf, .bin, .elf, .o, .out, .prx, .puff, .ko, .mod, .so	Executable and Linkable Format
89 50 4E 47 0D 0A 1A 0A	‰PNG␍␊␚␊	0	png	Image encoded in the Portable Network Graphics format
0E 03 13 01	␅␃␓␁	0	hdf4 h4	Data stored in version 4 of the Hierarchical Data Format.
89 48 44 46 0D 0A 1A 0A	‰HDF␍␊␚␊	0, 512, 1024, 2048, ...	hdf5 h5	Data stored in version 5 of the Hierarchical Data Format.
C9	É	0	com	CP/M 3 and higher with overlays
CA FE BA BE	Êþº¾	0	class	Java class file, Mach-O Fat Binary
EF BB BF	ï»¿	0	txt others	UTF-8 byte order mark, commonly seen in text files.
FF FE	ÿþ	0	txt others	UTF-16LE byte order mark, commonly seen in text files.
FE FF	þÿ	0	txt others	UTF-16BE byte order mark, commonly seen in text files.
FF FE 00 00	ÿþ␀␀	0	txt others	UTF-32LE byte order mark for text
00 00 FE FF	␀␀þÿ	0	txt others	UTF-32BE byte order mark for text
2B 2F 76 38; 2B 2F 76 39; 2B 2F 76 2B; 2B 2F 76 2F	+/v8 +/v9 +/v+ +/v/	0		UTF-7 byte order mark for text
0E FE FF	␎þÿ	0	txt others	SCSU byte order mark for text
DD 73 66 73	Ýsfs	0		UTF-EBCDIC byte order mark for text
FE ED FA CE	þíúÎ	0; 0x1000		Mach-O binary (32-bit)
FE ED FA CF	þíúÏ	0; 0x1000		Mach-O binary (64-bit)
FE ED FE ED	þíþí	0		JKS Javakey Store
CE FA ED FE	Îúíþ	0		Mach-O binary (reverse byte ordering scheme, 32-bit)
CF FA ED FE	Ïúíþ	0		Mach-O binary (reverse byte ordering scheme, 64-bit)
25 21 50 53	%!PS	0	ps	PostScript document
25 21 50 53 2D 41 64 6F 62 65 2D 33 2E 30 20 45 50 53 46 2D 33 2E 30	%!PS-Adobe-3.0 ESPF-3.0	0	eps epsf	Encapsulated PostScript file version 3.0
25 21 50 53 2D 41 64 6F 62 65 2D 33 2E 31 20 45 50 53 46 2D 33 2E 30	%!PS-Adobe-3.1 ESPF-3.0	0	eps epsf	Encapsulated PostScript file version 3.1
49 54 53 46 03 00 00 00; 60 00 00 00	ITSF␃␀␀␀`␀␀␀	0	chm	MS Windows HtmlHelp Data
3F 5F	?_	0	hlp	Windows 3.x/95/98 Help file
25 50 44 46 2D	%PDF-	0	pdf	PDF document
30 26 B2 75 8E 66 CF 11; A6 D9 00 AA 00 62 CE 6C	0&²uŽfÏ␑¦Ù␀ª␀bÎl	0	asf wma wmv	Advanced Systems Format
24 53 44 49 30 30 30 31	$SDI0001	0		System Deployment Image, a disk image format used by Microsoft
4F 67 67 53	OggS	0	ogg oga ogv	Ogg, an open source media container format
38 42 50 53	8BPS	0	psd	Photoshop Document file, Adobe Photoshop's native file format
52 49 46 46 ?? ?? ?? ?? 57 41 56 45	RIFF????WAVE	0	wav	Waveform Audio File Format
52 49 46 46 ?? ?? ?? ?? 41 56 49 20	RIFF????AVI␠	0	avi	Audio Video Interleave video format
FF FB; FF F3; FF F2	ÿû ÿó ÿò	0	mp3	MPEG-1 Layer 3 file without an ID3 tag or with an ID3v1 tag (which is appended at the end of the file)
49 44 33	ID3	0	mp3	MP3 file with an ID3v2 container
42 4D	BM	0	bmp dib	BMP file, a bitmap format used mostly in the Windows world
43 44 30 30 31	CD001	0x8001 0x8801 0x9001	iso	ISO9660 CD/DVD image file
43 44 30 30 31	CD001	0x5EAC9	cdi	CD-i CD image file
6D 61 69 6E 2E 62 73	main.bs	0	mgw	Nintendo Game & Watch image file
A0 32 41 A0 A0 A0	2A	0x165A4	d64	Commodore 64 1541 disk image (D64 format)
47 53 52 2D 31 35 34 31	GCR-1541	0	g64	Commodore 64 1541 disk image (G64 format)
A0 33 44 A0 A0	3D	0x61819	d81	Commodore 64 1581 disk image (D81 format)
43 36 34 20 74 61 70 65 20 69 6D 61 67 65 20 66 69 6C 65	C64 tape image file	0	t64	Commodore 64 tape image
43 36 34 20 43 41 52 54 52 49 44 47 45 20 20 20	C64 CARTRIDGE␠␠␠	0	crt	Commodore 64 cartridge image
53 49 4D 50 4C 45 20 20; 3D 20 20 20 20 20 20 20; 20 20 20 20 20 20 20 20; 20 20 20 20 20 54	SIMPLE␠␠ =␠␠␠␠␠␠␠ ␠␠␠␠␠␠␠␠ ␠␠␠␠␠T	0	fits	Flexible Image Transport System (FITS)
66 4C 61 43	fLaC	0	flac	Free Lossless Audio Codec
4D 54 68 64	MThd	0	mid midi	MIDI sound file
D0 CF 11 E0 A1 B1 1A E1	ÐÏ␑à¡±␚á	0	doc xls ppt msi msg	Compound File Binary Format, a container format defined by Microsoft COM. It can contain the equivalent of files and directories. It is used by Windows Installer and for documents in older versions of Microsoft Office. It can be used by other programs as well that rely on the COM and OLE API's. (0xD0CF11E0 visually resembles "DOCFILE".)
64 65 78 0A 30 33 35 00	dex␊035␀	0	dex	Dalvik Executable
4B 44 4D	KDM	0	vmdk	VMDK files
23 20 44 69 73 6B 20 44 65 73 63 72 69 70 74 6F	# Disk Descripto	0	vmdk	VMware 4 Virtual Disk description file (split disk)
43 72 32 34	Cr24	0	crx	Google Chrome extension or packaged app
41 47 44 33	AGD3	0	fh8	FreeHand 8 document
05 07 00 00 42 4F 42 4F; 05 07 00 00 00 00 00 00; 00 00 00 00 00 01	␅␇␀␀BOBO ␅␇␀␀␀␀␀␀ ␀␀␀␀␀␁	0	cwk	AppleWorks 5 document
06 07 E1 00 42 4F 42 4F; 06 07 E1 00 00 00 00 00; 00 00 00 00 00 01	␆␇á␀BOBO ␆␇á␀␀␀␀␀ ␀␀␀␀␀␁	0	cwk	AppleWorks 6 document
45 52 02 00 00 00	ER␂␀␀␀	0	toast	Roxio Toast disc image file
8B 45 52 02 00 00 00	‹ER␂␀␀␀	0	toast	Roxio Toast disc image file
6B 6F 6C 79	koly	end–512	dmg	Apple Disk Image file
78 61 72 21	xar!	0	xar	eXtensible ARchive format
50 4D 4F 43 43 4D 4F 43	PMOCCMOC	0	dat	Windows Files And Settings Transfer Repository See also USMT 3.0 (Win XP) and USMT 4.0 (Win 7) User Guides
4E 45 53 1A	NES␚	0	nes	Nintendo Entertainment System ROM file
75 73 74 61 72 00 30 30; 75 73 74 61 72 20 20 00	ustar␀00 ustar␠␠␀	257	tar	tar archive
4F 41 52 ??	OAR?	0	oar	OAR file archive format, where ?? is the format version.
74 6F 78 33	tox3	0	tox	Open source portable voxel file
4D 4C 56 49	MLVI	0	MLV	Magic Lantern Video file
44 43 4D 01 50 41 33 30; 50 41 33 30	DCM␁PA30; PA30	0		Windows Update Binary Delta Compression file
37 7A BC AF 27 1C	7z¼¯'␜	0	7z	7-Zip File Format
1F 8B	␟‹	0	gz tar.gz	GZIP compressed file
FD 37 7A 58 5A 00	ý7zXZ␀	0	xz tar.xz	XZ compression utility using LZMA2 compression
04 22 4D 18	␄"M␘	0	lz4	LZ4 Frame Format; Remark: LZ4 block format does not offer any magic bytes.
4D 53 43 46	MSCF	0	cab	Microsoft Cabinet file
53 5A 44 44 88 F0 27 33	SZDDˆð'3	0	??_	Microsoft compressed file in Quantum format, used prior to Windows XP. File can be decompressed using Extract.exe or Expand.exe distributed with earlier versions of Windows. After compression, the last character of the original filename extension is replaced with an underscore, e.g. ‘Setup.exe’ becomes ‘Setup.ex_’.
46 4C 49 46	FLIF	0	flif	Free Lossless Image Format
1A 45 DF A3	␚Eß£	0	mkv mka mks mk3d webm	Matroska media container, including WebM
4D 49 4C 20	MIL␠	0	stg	"SEAN : Session Analysis" Training file. Also used in compatible software "Rpw : Rowperfect for Windows" and "RP3W : ROWPERFECT3 for Windows".
41 54 26 54 46 4F 52 4D ?? ?? ?? ?? 44 4A 56	AT&TFORM????DJV	0	djvu djv	DjVu document The following byte is either 55 (U) for single-page or 4D (M) for multi-page documents.
2D 2D 2D 2D 2D 42 45 47 49 4E 20 43 45 52 54 49 46 49 43 41 54 45 2D 2D 2D 2D 2D	-----BEGIN CERTIFICATE-----	0	crt pem	PEM encoded X.509 certificate
2D 2D 2D 2D 2D 42 45 47 49 4E 20 43 45 52 54 49 46 49 43 41 54 45 20 52 45 51 55 45 53 54 2D 2D 2D 2D 2D	-----BEGIN CERTIFICATE REQUEST-----	0	csr pem	PEM encoded X.509 Certificate Signing Request
2D 2D 2D 2D 2D 42 45 47 49 4E 20 50 52 49 56 41 54 45 20 4B 45 59 2D 2D 2D 2D 2D	-----BEGIN PRIVATE KEY-----	0	key pem	PEM encoded X.509 PKCS#8 private key
2D 2D 2D 2D 2D 42 45 47 49 4E 20 44 53 41 20 50 52 49 56 41 54 45 20 4B 45 59 2D 2D 2D 2D 2D	-----BEGIN DSA PRIVATE KEY-----	0	key pem	PEM encoded X.509 PKCS#1 DSA private key
2D 2D 2D 2D 2D 42 45 47 49 4E 20 52 53 41 20 50 52 49 56 41 54 45 20 4B 45 59 2D 2D 2D 2D 2D	-----BEGIN RSA PRIVATE KEY-----	0	key pem	PEM encoded X.509 PKCS#1 RSA private key
50 75 54 54 59 2D 55 73 65 72 2D 4B 65 79 2D 46 69 6C 65 2D 32 3A	PuTTY-User-Key-File-2:	0	ppk	PuTTY private key file version 2
50 75 54 54 59 2D 55 73 65 72 2D 4B 65 79 2D 46 69 6C 65 2D 33 3A	PuTTY-User-Key-File-3:	0	ppk	PuTTY private key file version 3
2D 2D 2D 2D 2D 42 45 47 49 4E 20 4F 50 45 4E 53 53 48 20 50 52 49 56 41 54 45 20 4B 45 59 2D 2D 2D 2D 2D	-----BEGIN OPENSSH PRIVATE KEY-----	0		OpenSSH private key file
2D 2D 2D 2D 2D 42 45 47 49 4E 20 53 53 48 32 20 4B 45 59 2D 2D 2D 2D 2D	-----BEGIN SSH2 PUBLIC KEY-----	0	pub	OpenSSH public key file
44 49 43 4D	DICM	128	dcm	DICOM Medical File Format
77 4F 46 46	wOFF	0	woff	WOFF File Format 1.0
77 4F 46 32	wOF2	0	woff2	WOFF File Format 2.0
3C 3F 78 6D 6C 20	<?xml␠	0 after BOM	xml (UTF-8 or other 8-bit encodings)	eXtensible Markup Language
3C 00 3F 00 78 00 6D 00; 6C 00 20	<␀?␀x␀m␀l␀␠␀	0 after BOM	xml (UTF-16LE)	eXtensible Markup Language
00 3C 00 3F 00 78 00 6D; 00 6C 00 20	␀<␀?␀x␀m␀l␀␠	0 after BOM	xml (UTF-16BE)	eXtensible Markup Language
3C 00 00 00 3F 00 00 00; 78 00 00 00 6D 00 00 00; 6C 00 00 00 20 00 00 00	<␀␀␀?␀␀␀ x␀␀␀m␀␀␀ l␀␀␀␠␀␀␀	0 after BOM	xml (UTF-32LE)	eXtensible Markup Language
00 00 00 3C 00 00 00 3F; 00 00 00 78 00 00 00 6D; 00 00 00 6C 00 00 00 20	␀␀␀<␀␀␀? ␀␀␀x␀␀␀m ␀␀␀l␀␀␀␠	0 after BOM	xml (UTF-32BE)	eXtensible Markup Language
4C 6F A7 94 93 40	Lo§”“@	0 after BOM	xml (EBCDIC)	eXtensible Markup Language
00 61 73 6D	␀asm	0	wasm	WebAssembly binary format
CF 84 01	Ï„␁	0	lep	Lepton compressed JPEG image
43 57 53	CWS	0	swf	Adobe Flash .swf
46 57 53	FWS	0	swf	Adobe Flash .swf
21 3C 61 72 63 68 3E 0A	!<arch>␊	0	deb	linux deb file
C0 3B 39 98	À;9˜	0		Linux EXT3/EXT4 jbd2 filesystem Journal
52 49 46 46 ?? ?? ?? ?? 57 45 42 50	RIFF????WEBP	0	webp	Google WebP image file, where ?? ?? ?? ?? is the file size. More information on WebP File Header
27 05 19 56	'␅␙V	0		U-Boot / uImage. Das U-Boot Universal Boot Loader.
7B 5C 72 74 66 31	{\rtf1	0	rtf	Rich Text Format
54 41 50 45	TAPE	0		Microsoft Tape Format
47	G	0; 0xBC; 0x178... (every 188th byte)	ts tsv tsa mpg mpeg	MPEG Transport Stream (MPEG-2 Part 1)
00 00 01 BA	␀␀␁º	0	m2p vob mpg mpeg	MPEG Program Stream (MPEG-1 Part 1 (essentially identical) and MPEG-2 Part 1)
00 00 01 B3	␀␀␁³	0	mpg mpeg	MPEG-1 video and MPEG-2 video (MPEG-1 Part 2 and MPEG-2 Part 2)
66 74 79 70 69 73 6F 6D	ftypisom	4	mp4	ISO Base Media file (MPEG-4)
66 74 79 70 4D 53 4E 56	ftypMSNV	4	mp4	MPEG-4 video file
78 01	x␁	0	zlib	No Compression (no preset dictionary)
78 5E	x^	0	zlib	Best speed (no preset dictionary)
78 9C	xœ	0	zlib	Default Compression (no preset dictionary)
78 DA	xÚ	0	zlib	Best Compression (no preset dictionary)
78 20	x␠	0	zlib	No Compression (with preset dictionary)
78 7D	x}	0	zlib	Best speed (with preset dictionary)
78 BB	x»	0	zlib	Default Compression (with preset dictionary)
78 F9	xù	0	zlib	Best Compression (with preset dictionary)
62 76 78 32	bvx2	0	lzfse	LZFSE - Lempel-Ziv style data compression algorithm using Finite State Entropy coding. OSS by Apple.
4F 52 43	ORC	0	orc	Apache ORC (Optimized Row Columnar) file format
4F 62 6A 01	Obj␁	0	avro	Apache Avro binary file format
53 45 51 36	SEQ6	0	rc	RCFile columnar file format
3C 72 6F 62 6C 6F 78 21	<roblox!	0	rbxl	Roblox place file
65 87 78 56	e‡xV	0	p25 obt	PhotoCap Object Templates
55 55 AA AA	UUªª	0	pcv	PhotoCap Vector
78 56 34	xV4	0	pbt pdt pea peb pet pgt pict pjt pkt pmt	PhotoCap Template
50 41 52 31	PAR1	0		Apache Parquet columnar file format
45 4D 58 32	EMX2	0	ez2	Emulator Emaxsynth samples
45 4D 55 33	EMU3	0	ez3 iso	Emulator III synth samples
1B 4C 75 61	␛Lua	0	luac	Lua bytecode
62 6F 6F 6B 00 00 00 00; 6D 61 72 6B 00 00 00 00	book␀␀␀␀mark␀␀␀␀	0	alias	macOS file Alias (Symbolic link)
62 6F 6F 6B	book	0		macOS bookmark format
5B 5A 6F 6E 65 54 72 61; 6E 73 66 65 72 5D	[ZoneTransfer]	0	Identifier	Microsoft Zone Identifier for URL Security Zones
52 65 63 65 69 76 65 64; 3A	Received:	0	eml	Email Message var5
20 02 01 62 A0 1E AB 07; 02 00 00 00	␠␂␁b⍽␞«␇␂␀␀␀	0	tde	Tableau Datasource
37 48 03 02 00 00 00 00; 58 35 30 39 4B 45 59	7H␃␂␀␀␀␀X509KEY	0	kdb	KDB file
85 ?? ?? 03	…??␃	0	pgp	PGP file
28 B5 2F FD	(µ/ý	0	zst	Zstandard compress
52 53 56 4B 44 41 54 41	RSVKDATA	0	rs	QuickZip rs compressed archive
3A 29 0A	:)␊	0	sml	Smile file
4A 6F 79 21	Joy!	0		Preferred Executable Format
34 12 AA 55	4␒ªU	0	vpk	VPK file, used to store game data for some Source Engine games
2A 2A 41 43 45 2A 2A	**ACE**	7	ace	ACE (compressed file format)
60 EA	`ê	0	arj	ARJ
49 53 63 28	ISc(	0	cab	InstallShield CAB Archive File
4B 57 41 4A	KWAJ	0	??_	Windows 3.1x Compressed File
53 5A 44 44	SZDD	0	??_	Windows 9x Compressed File
5A 4F 4F	ZOO	0	zoo	Zoo (file format)
50 31 0A	P1␊	0	pbm	Portable bitmap ASCII
50 34 0A	P4␊	0	pbm	Portable bitmap binary
50 32 0A	P2␊	0	pgm	Portable Gray Map ASCII
50 35 0A	P5␊	0	pgm	Portable Gray Map binary
50 33 0A	P3␊	0	ppm	Portable Pixmap ASCII
50 36 0A	P6␊	0	ppm	Portable Pixmap binary
D7 CD C6 9A	×ÍÆš	0	wmf	Windows Metafile
67 69 6D 70 20 78 63 66	gimp xcf	0	xcf	XCF (file format)
2F 2A 20 58 50 4D 20 2A; 2F	/* XPM */	0	xpm	X PixMap
41 46 46	AFF	0	aff	Advanced Forensics Format
45 56 46 32	EVF2	0	Ex01	EnCase EWF version 2 format
45 56 46	EVF	0	e01	EnCase EWF version 1 format
51 46 49	QFI	0	qcow	qcow file format
52 49 46 46 ?? ?? ?? ?? 41 43 4F 4E	RIFF????ACON	0	ani	Animated cursor
52 49 46 46 ?? ?? ?? ?? 43 44 44 41	RIFF????CDDA	0	cda	.cda file
52 49 46 46 ?? ?? ?? ?? 51 4C 43 4D	RIFF????QLCM	0	qcp	Qualcomm PureVoice file format
52 49 46 58 ?? ?? ?? ?? 46 47 44 4D (big-endian)	RIFX????FGDM	0	dcr	Adobe Shockwave
58 46 49 52 ?? ?? ?? ?? 4D 44 47 46 (little-endian)	XFIR????MDGF	0	dcr	Adobe Shockwave
52 49 46 58 ?? ?? ?? ?? 4D 56 39 33 (big-endian)	RIFX????MV93	0	dir dxr drx	Macromedia Director file format
58 46 49 52 ?? ?? ?? ?? 33 39 56 4D (little-endian)	XFIR????39VM	0	dir dxr drx	Macromedia Director file format
46 4C 56	FLV	0	flv	Flash Video file
3C 3C 3C 20 4F 72 61 63; 6C 65 20 56 4D 20 56 69; 72 74 75 61 6C 42 6F 78; 20 44 69 73 6B 20 49 6D; 61 67 65 20 3E 3E 3E	<<< Orac le VM Vi rtualBox; Disk Im age >>>	0	vdi	VirtualBox Virtual Hard Disk file format
63 6F 6E 65 63 74 69 78	conectix	0	vhd	Windows Virtual PC Virtual Hard Disk file format
76 68 64 78 66 69 6C 65	vhdxfile	0	vhdx	Windows Virtual PC Windows 8 Virtual Hard Disk file format
49 73 5A 21	IsZ!	0	isz	Compressed ISO image
44 41 41	DAA	0	daa	Direct Access Archive PowerISO
4C 66 4C 65	LfLe	0	evt	Windows Event Viewer file format
45 6C 66 46 69 6C 65	ElfFile	0	evtx	Windows Event Viewer XML file format
73 64 62 66	sdbf	8	sdb	Windows customized database
50 4D 43 43	PMCC	0	grp	Windows 3.x Program Manager Program Group file format
4B 43 4D 53	KCMS	0	icm	ICC profile
72 65 67 66	regf	0	dat hiv	Windows Registry file
21 42 44 4E	!BDN	0	pst	Microsoft Outlook Personal Storage Table file
44 52 41 43 4F	DRACO	0	drc	3D model compressed with Google Draco
47 52 49 42	GRIB	0	grib grib2	Gridded data (commonly weather observations or forecasts) in the WMO GRIB or GRIB2 format
42 4C 45 4E 44 45 52	BLENDER	0	blend	Blender File Format
00 00 00 0C 4A 58 4C 20 0D 0A 87 0A	␀␀␀␌JXL␠␍␊‡␊	0	jxl	Image encoded in the JPEG XL format
FF 0A	ÿ␊	0	jxl	Image encoded in the JPEG XL format
00 01 00 00 00	␀␁␀␀␀	0	ttf tte dfont	TrueType font
4F 54 54 4F	OTTO	0	otf	OpenType font
23 25 4D 6F 64 75 6C 65	#%Module	0		Modulefile for Environment Modules
4D 53 57 49 4D 00 00 00; D0 00 00 00 00	MSWIM␀␀␀Ð␀␀␀␀	0	wim swm esd	Windows Imaging Format file
21 2D 31 53 4C 4F 42 1F	!-1SLOB␟	0	slob	Slob (sorted list of Object storages) is a read-only, compressed data store with dictionary-like interface
AC ED	¬í	0		Serialized Java Data
43 72 65 61 74 69 76 65 20 56 6F 69 63 65 20 46 69 6C 65 1A 1A 00	Creative Voice File	0	voc	Creative Voice file
2E 73 6E 64	.snd	0	au snd	Au audio file format
DB 0A CE 00		0		OpenGL Iris Perfomer .PFB (Performer Fast Binary)
48 5a 4c 52 00 00 00 18	HZLR	0	hazelrules	Noodlesoft Hazel
46 4C 68 64	FLhd	0	flp	FL Studio Project File
31 30 4C 46	10LF	0	flm	FL Studio Mobile Project File
52 4b 4d 43 32 31 30	RKMC210	0		Vormetric Encryption DPM Version 2.1 Header
00 01 00 00 4D 53 49 53 41 4D 20 44 61 74 61 62 61 73 65	␀␁␀␀MSISAM Database	0	mny	Microsoft Money file
00 01 00 00 53 74 61 6E 64 61 72 64 20 41 43 45 20 44 42	␀␁␀␀Standard ACE DB	0	accdb	Microsoft Access 2007 Database
00 01 00 00 53 74 61 6E 64 61 72 64 20 4A 65 74 20 44 42	␀␁␀␀Standard Jet DB	0	mdb	Microsoft Access Database
01 FF 02 04 03 02	␁ÿ␂␄␃␂	0	drw	Micrografx vector graphic file
02 64 73 73	␂dss	0	dss	Digital Speech Standard (Olympus, Grundig, & Phillips) v2
03 64 73 73	␃dss	0	dss	Digital Speech Standard (Olympus, Grundig, & Phillips) v3
03 00 00 00 41 50 50 52	␃␀␀␀APPR	0	adx	Approach index file
06 06 ED F5 D8 1D 46 E5 BD 31 EF E7 FE 74 B7 1D	␆␆íõØ␝Få½1ïçþt·␝	0	indd	Adobe InDesign document
06 0E 2B 34 02 05 01 01 0D 01 02 01 01 02	␆␎+4␂␅␁␁␍␁␂␁␁␂	0-65535 (run-in)	mxf	Material Exchange Format file
07 53 4B 46	␇SKF	0	skf	SkinCrafter skin file
07 64 74 32 64 64 74 64	␇dt2ddtd	0	dtd	DesignTools 2D Design file
0A 16 6F 72 67 2E 62 69 74 63 6F 69 6E 2E 70 72	␊␖org.bitcoin.pr	0	wallet	MultiBit Bitcoin wallet file
0D 44 4F 43	␍DOC	0	doc	DeskMate Document file
0E 4E 65 72 6F 49 53 4F	␎NeroISO	0	nri	Nero CD Compilation
0E 57 4B 53	␎WKS	0	wks	DeskMate Worksheet
0F 53 49 42 45 4C 49 55 53	␏SIBELIUS	0	sib	Sibelius Music - Score file
23 20 4D 69 63 72 6F 73 6F 66 74 20 44 65 76 65 6C 6F 70 65 72 20 53 74 75 64 69 6F	# Microsoft Developer Studio	0	dsp	Microsoft Developer Studio project file
23 21 41 4D 52	#!AMR	0	amr	Adaptive Multi-Rate ACELP (Algebraic Code Excited Linear Prediction) Codec, commonly audio format with GSM cell phones.
23 21 53 49 4C 4B 0A	#!SILK␊	0	sil	Audio compression format developed by Skype
23 3F 52 41 44 49 41 4E 43 45 0A	#?RADIANCE␊	0	hdr	Radiance High Dynamic Range image file
23 40 7E 5E	#@~^	0	vbe	VBScript Encoded script
0D F0 1D C0	␍ð�À	0	cdb	MikroTik WinBox Connection Database (Address Book)
23 45 58 54 4D 33 55	#EXTM3U	0	m3u m3u8	Multimedia playlist
6D 64 66 00	mdf␀	0	m	M2 Archive, used by game developer M2
4B 50 4B 41	KPKA	0	pak	Capcom RE Engine game data archives
41 52 43	ARC	0	arc	Capcom MT Framework game data archives
41 72 43	ArC	0	arc cdx	FreeArc file
D0 4F 50 53	ÐOPS	0	pl	Interleaf PrinterLeaf / WorldView document format (now Broadvision QuickSilver)
6E 2B 31 00	n+1	344	nii	Single file NIfTI format, used extensively in biomedical imaging.
6E 69 31 00	ni1	344	hdr	Header file of a .hdr/.img pair in NIfTI format, used extensively in biomedical imaging.
52 41 46 36 34	RAF64	0		Report Builder file from Digital Metaphors
56 49 53 33	VIS3	0		Resource file Visionaire 3.x Engine
4D 53 48 7C; 42 53 48 7C	MSH| BSH|	0	hl7	Health Level Seven (HL7) Standard for electronic data exchange
70 77 72 64 61 74 61	pwrdata	0	pwrdata	SAP Power Monitor (version 1.1.0 and higher) data file
1a 08	..	0	arc	ARC archive file
2d 2d 2d 2d 2d 42 45 47 49 4e 20 50 47 50 20 50 55 42 4c 49 43 20 4b 45 49 20 42 4c 4f 43 4b 2d 2d 2d 2d 2d	-----BEGIN PGP PUBLIC KEY BLOCK-----	0	asc	Armored PGP public key
3a 42 61 73 65 20	:Base	0	cnt	Windows 3.x - Windows 95 Help Contents
52 49 46 46 ?? ?? ?? ?? 56 44 52 4d	RIFF????VDRM	0	vdr	VirtualDub
52 59 46 46 ?? ?? ?? ?? 54 52 49 44	RIFF????TRID	0	trd	TrID
52 49 46 46 ?? ?? ?? ?? 73 68 77 34	RIFF????shw4	0	shw	Corel SHOW! 4.0
52 49 46 46 ?? ?? ?? ?? 73 68 77 35	RIFF????shw5	0	shw	Corel SHOW! 5.0
52 49 46 46 ?? ?? ?? ?? 73 68 72 35	RIFF????shr5	0	shr	Corel SHOW! 5.0 player
52 49 46 46 ?? ?? ?? ?? 73 68 62 35	RIFF????shb5	0	shb	Corel SHOW! 5.0 background
52 49 46 46 ?? ?? ?? ?? 52 4d 4d 50	RIFF????RMMP	0	mmm	MacroMind Multimedia Movie or Microsoft Multimedia Movie
41 53 54 4d 2d 45 35 37	ASTM-E57	0	e57	ASTM E57 3D file format
aa aa aa aa	ªªªª	0	sys	Crowdstrike Channel File
8C 0A 00	Œ..	0	ucas	Unreal Engine Compressed Asset Storage file
2D 3D 3D 2D 2D 3D 3D 2D 2D 3D 3D 2D 2D 3D 3D 2D	-==--==--==--==-	0	utoc	Unreal Engine Table of Contents file
43 36 34 46 69 6C 65 00	C64File	0	P00 (P01, P02,...)	Commodore 64 binary file (source: *.P00 format for Power64 emulator)
44 55 43 4B	DUCK	8		DuckDB database file (source: Source code)
4C 50 4B 53 48 48 52 48	LPKSHHRH	0	journal	journald log file
E0 01 00 EA	ê␀␁à	0		Ion (serialization format) binary encoding
42 53 44 49 46 46 34 30	BSDIFF40	0		bsdiff binary patch
7C 61 8A B2	|aŠ²	0	hpapp hpprgm hpsettings	HP Prime graphing calculator file
43 5A 50 58	CZPX	0	czx	Czip X encrypted archive (v4.x)
43 50 43 48	CPCH	0	pch	Clang pre-compiled header
67 6C 54 46	glTF	0	glb	Binary glTF file
00 00 00 18 66 74 79 70 68 65 69 63 00 00 00 00	␀␀␀ftypheic␀␀␀␀	0	heif	Apple HEIF image file
21 3C 73 79 6D 6C 69 6E 6B 3E	!<symlink>	0		Cygwin symlinks

== See also ==
- List of filename extensions - alternative for file type identification and parsing
- List of file formats
- Magic number (programming)
- Substitute character (for the 1Ah (^Z) "end-of-file" marker used in many signatures)
- file (command)
