= Audio file format =

Computer format for digital audio

An audio file format is a file format for storing digital audio data on a computer system. The bit layout of the audio data (excluding metadata) is called the audio coding format and can be uncompressed or compressed to reduce the file size, often using lossy compression. The data can be a raw bitstream in an audio coding format, but it is usually embedded in a container format or an audio data format with a defined storage layer.

== Format types ==
It is important to distinguish between the audio coding format, the container containing the raw audio data, and an audio codec. A codec performs the encoding and decoding of the raw audio data and this encoded data is then usually stored in a container file. Although most audio file formats support only one type of audio coding data (created with an audio coder), a multimedia container format (as Matroska or AVI) may support multiple types of audio and video data.

There are three major groups of audio file formats:

- Uncompressed audio formats, such as WAV, AIFF, AU or raw header-less PCM; Note WAV can alternatively use compression.
- Formats with lossless compression, such as FLAC, Monkey's Audio (filename extension .ape), WavPack (filename extension .wv), TTA, ATRAC Advanced Lossless, ALAC, MPEG-4 SLS, MPEG-4 ALS, MPEG-4 DST, Windows Media Audio Lossless (WMA Lossless), and Shorten (SHN).
- Formats with lossy compression, such as Opus, MP3, Vorbis, Musepack, AAC, ATRAC and Windows Media Audio Lossy (WMA lossy).

=== Uncompressed audio format ===
One major uncompressed audio format, LPCM, is the same variety of PCM as used in Compact Disc Digital Audio and is the format most commonly accepted by low-level audio APIs and D/A converter hardware. Although LPCM can be stored on a computer as a raw audio format, it is usually stored in a .wav file on Windows or in a .aiff file on macOS. The Audio Interchange File Format (AIFF) format is based on the Interchange File Format (IFF), and the WAV format is based on the similar Resource Interchange File Format (RIFF). WAV and AIFF are designed to store a wide variety of audio formats, lossless and lossy; they just add a small, metadata-containing header before the audio data to declare the format of the audio data, such as LPCM with a particular sample rate, bit depth, endianness and number of channels. Since WAV and AIFF are widely supported and can store LPCM, they are suitable file formats for storing and archiving an original recording.

BWF (Broadcast Wave Format) is a standard audio format created by the European Broadcasting Union as a successor to WAV. Among other enhancements, BWF allows more robust metadata to be stored in the file. See European Broadcasting Union: Specification of the Broadcast Wave Format (EBU Technical document 3285, July 1997). This is the primary recording format used in many professional audio workstations in the television and film industry. BWF files include a standardized timestamp reference which allows for easy synchronization with a separate picture element. Stand-alone, file based, multi-track recorders from AETA, Sound Devices, Zaxcom, HHB Communications Ltd, Fostex, Nagra, Aaton, and TASCAM all use BWF as their preferred format.

=== Lossless compressed audio format ===
A lossless compressed audio format stores data in less space without losing any information. The original, uncompressed data can be recreated from the compressed version.

Uncompressed audio formats encode both sound and silence with the same number of bits per unit of time. Encoding an uncompressed minute of absolute silence produces a file of the same size as encoding an uncompressed minute of music. In a lossless compressed format, however, the music would occupy a smaller file than an uncompressed format and the silence would take up almost no space at all.

Lossless compression formats include FLAC, WavPack, Monkey's Audio, ALAC (Apple Lossless). They provide a compression ratio of about 2:1 (i.e., their files take up half the space of PCM). Development in lossless compression formats aims to reduce processing time while maintaining a good compression ratio.

=== Lossy compressed audio format ===
Lossy audio formats enable even greater reductions in file size by removing some of the audio information and simplifying the data. This, of course, results in a reduction in audio quality, but a variety of techniques are used, mainly by exploiting psychoacoustics, to remove the parts of the sound that have the least effect on perceived quality, and to minimize the amount of audible noise added during the process. The popular MP3 format is probably the best-known example, but the AAC format found on the iTunes Music Store is also common. Most formats offer a range of degrees of compression, generally measured in bit rate. The lower the rate, the smaller the file and the more significant the quality loss.

== List of formats ==
File Extension	Creation Company	Description
.3gp		Multimedia container format can contain proprietary formats as AMR, AMR-WB or AMR-WB+, but also some open formats
.aa	Audible (Amazon)	A low-bitrate audiobook container format with DRM, containing audio encoded as either MP3 or the ACELP speech codec.
.aac		The Advanced Audio Coding format is based on the MPEG-2 and MPEG-4 standards. AAC files are usually ADTS or ADIF containers.
.aax	Audible (Amazon)	An Audiobook format, which is a variable-bitrate (allowing high quality) M4B file encrypted with DRM. MPB contains AAC or ALAC encoded audio in an MPEG-4 container. (More details below.)
.act		ACT is a lossy ADPCM 8 kbit/s compressed audio format recorded by most Chinese MP3 and MP4 players with a recording function, and voice recorders
.aiff	Apple	A standard uncompressed CD-quality audio file format used by Apple. Established 3 years prior to Microsoft's uncompressed version WAV.
.alac	Apple	An audio coding format developed by Apple Inc. for lossless data compression of digital music.
.amr		AMR-NB audio, used primarily for speech.
.ape	Matthew T. Ashland	Monkey's Audio lossless audio compression format.
.au	Sun Microsystems	The standard audio file format used by Sun, Unix and Java. The audio in au files can be PCM or compressed with the μ-law, a-law or G.729 codecs.
.awb		AMR-WB audio, used primarily for speech, same as the ITU-T's G.722.2 specification.
.dss	Olympus	DSS files are an Olympus proprietary format. DSS files use a high compression rate, which reduces the file size and allows files to be copied and transferred quickly. It allows additional data to be held in the file header.
.dvf	Sony	A Sony proprietary format for compressed voice files; commonly used by Sony dictation recorders.
.flac		A file format for the Free Lossless Audio Codec, an open-source lossless compression codec.
.gsm		Designed for telephony use in Europe, GSM is used to store telephone voice messages and conversations. With a bitrate of 13 kbit/s, GSM files can compress and encode audio at telephone quality. Note that WAV files can also be encoded with the GSM codec.
.iklax	iKlax	An iKlax Media proprietary format, the iKlax format is a multi-track digital audio format allowing various actions on musical data, for instance on mixing and volumes arrangements.
.ivs	3D Solar UK Ltd	A proprietary version with DRM developed by 3D Solar UK Ltd for use in music downloaded from their Tronme Music Store and interactive music and video player.
.m4a		An AAC or ALAC encoded audio file in an MPEG-4 container. In Apple's iTunes Music Store, M4A is used to represent a downloaded music file that is unprotected.
.m4b		An Audiobook / podcast extension with AAC or ALAC encoded audio in an MPEG-4 container. Both M4A and M4B formats can contain metadata including chapter markers, images, and hyperlinks, but M4B allows "bookmarks" (remembering the last listening spot), whereas M4A does not.
.m4p	Apple	A version of AAC with proprietary DRM developed by Apple for use in their music streaming service known as Apple Music and was used for music downloaded from their iTunes Music Store.
.mmf	Yamaha, Samsung	A Samsung audio format that is used in ringtones. Developed by Yamaha (SMAF stands for "Synthetic music Mobile Application Format", and is a multimedia data format invented by the Yamaha Corporation, .mmf file format).
.movpkg	Apple	An Apple audio format primarily used for Lossless and Hi-Res audio files through Apple Music. Also used for storing Apple TV videos.
.mp1		MPEG-1 Layer I Audio
.mp2		MPEG-1/MPEG-2 Layer II Audio
.mp3		MPEG-1/MPEG-2 Layer III Audio
.mpc		Musepack or MPC (formerly known as MPEGplus, MPEG+ or MP+) is an open source lossy audio codec, specifically optimized for transparent compression of stereo audio at bitrates of 160–180 kbit/s.
.msv	Sony	A Sony proprietary format for Memory Stick compressed voice files.
.nmf	NICE	NICE Media Player audio file
.ogg, .oga, .mogg	Xiph.Org Foundation	A free, open-source container format supporting a variety of formats, the most popular of which is the audio format Vorbis. Vorbis offers compression similar to MP3 but is less popular. Mogg, the "Multi-Track-Single-Logical-Stream Ogg-Vorbis", is the multi-channel or multi-track Ogg file format.
.opus	Internet Engineering Task Force	A lossy audio compression format developed by the Internet Engineering Task Force (IETF) and made especially suitable for interactive real-time applications over the Internet. As an open format standardised through RFC 6716, a reference implementation is provided under the 3-clause BSD license.
.qoa		A free and open source, lossy, time-domain audio compression format created by Dominic Szablewski. It is claimed to be able to decode audio three times faster than Ogg-Vorbis, while offering better quality and compression than ADPCM. The format compresses 44 kHz stereo audio to a bit rate of ~277 kbit/s.
.ra, .rm	RealNetworks	A RealAudio format designed for streaming audio over the Internet. The .ra format allows files to be stored in a self-contained fashion on a computer, with all of the audio data contained inside the file itself.
.raw		A raw file can contain audio in any format but is usually used with PCM audio data. It is rarely used except for technical tests.
.rf64		One successor to the WAV format, overcoming the 4GiB size limitation.
.sln		Signed Linear PCM format used by Asterisk. Prior to v.10 the standard formats were 16-bit Signed Linear PCM sampled at 8 kHz and at 16 kHz. With v.10 many more sampling rates were added.
.tta		The True Audio, real-time lossless audio codec.
.voc	Creative Technology	The file format consists of a 26-byte header and a series of subsequent data blocks containing the audio information
.vox		The vox format most commonly uses the Dialogic ADPCM (Adaptive Differential Pulse Code Modulation) codec. Similar to other ADPCM formats, it compresses to 4-bits. Vox format files are similar to WAV files except that the vox files contain no information about the file itself so the codec sample rate and number of channels must first be specified in order to play a vox file.
.wav	IBM and Microsoft	Standard audio file container format used mainly in Windows PCs. Commonly used for storing uncompressed (PCM), CD-quality sound files, which means that they can be large in size—around 10 MB per minute. WAV files can also contain data encoded with a variety of (lossy) codecs to reduce the file size (for example, the GSM or MP3 formats). WAV files use a RIFF structure.
.wma	Microsoft	Windows Media Audio format, created by Microsoft. Designed with DRM abilities for copy protection.
.wv		Format for WavPack files.
.webm		Royalty-free format created for HTML video.
.8svx	Electronic Arts	The IFF-8SVX format for 8-bit sound samples, created by Electronic Arts in 1984 at the birth of the Amiga.
.cda		Format for cda files for Radio.

== See also ==
- Video file format
- Audio compression (data)
- Comparison of audio coding formats
- Comparison of video container formats
- Comparison of video codecs
- List of open-source audio codecs
- Timeline of audio formats
