= SoundApp =

Freeware audio player app for the Classic Mac OS

- SoundApp software icon
- Original author: Norman Franke
- Release: 1993; 33 years ago
- Stable release: 2.7.3 / November 13, 2000; 25 years ago
- Operating system: System 7, Mac OS 8, Mac OS 9
- Platform: PowerPC and 68k
- Available in: English, with ports to Japanese, French, Dutch, Italian and German
- Type: Audio player and converter
- License: Freeware
- Website: http://www-cs-students.stanford.edu/~franke/SoundApp/

SoundApp is a freeware audio player for the Classic Mac OS. It was among the earliest MP3 players for the Classic Mac OS, and was widely praised for its ability to play back, and convert between, a variety of audio file formats.

The program appears to have been abandoned by its creator, Norman Franke, after the release of SoundApp 2.7.3. Franke's reasons for abandoning the project have never been made public, and SoundApp has never been ported to Mac OS X.

Another developer, Joachim Bengtsson / Third Cog Software, began a version for Mac OS X, "SoundApp Reborn". This project did not use any of Franke's original code. SoundApp Reborn reached version 0.1.1 in 2009 and supported audio playback but not conversion.. As at 2026 the website for SoundApp Reborn is inaccessible.

== Features ==
=== Audio formats ===
- AIFF and AIFF-C
- Amiga IFF (8SVX)
- Audio CD Tracks
- AVR
- DVI ADPCM
- EPOC 32 (Psion Series 5)
- GSM 06.10
- IMA ADPCM
- IRCAM
- MIDI
- Amiga MOD
- MPEG Audio (including MP3)
- PARIS
- PSION sound
- QuickTime Movies
- Sound Blaster VOC
- Sound Designer and Sound Designer II
- SoundCap
- SoundEdit
- Sun Audio (AU) and NeXT
- Studio Session Instrument
- System 7 and SND files
- Windows WAV
