= RetroCode =

Mobile content converter

- Developer(s): Till Tönshoff
- Operating system: Mac OS X, Windows, Linux, Solaris
- License: GNU General Public License
- Website: https://sourceforge.net/projects/retrocode/

RetroCode is a universal mobile content converter originally created by Retro Ringtones LLC. RetroCode is able to read and write most common sample-based ringtone formats including meta-data.

== Overview ==
RetroCode reads and writes many common mobile sample content file formats. RetroCode takes measures for making sure that meta-data is maintained and converted between the formats. It features filters for adapting audio content to the abilities of small handheld devices. RetroCode also includes a ringback-signal synthesizer allowing to mix audio content with standard ITU ringback signals.

== Compatibility ==
RetroCode currently supports the following formats

Format Name	Read / Decode	Write / Encode
Beatnik RMF (uncompressed)	Yes	No
Beatnik RMF (IMA ADPCM)	Yes	Yes
Beatnik RMF (MPEG)	Yes	No
Yamaha MA2	Yes	Yes
Yamaha MA3	Yes	Yes
Yamaha MA5	Yes	Yes
Yamaha MA7	Yes	Yes
Panasonic MFM	Yes	Yes
SAGEM Wave	Yes	Yes
Qualcomm QCELP	Yes	Yes
Qualcomm CMX	Yes	Yes
AMR NB	Yes	Yes
AMR WB	Yes	Yes
MPEG 2 Layer 1,2 and 3	Yes	Yes
AAC	Yes	Yes
Macromedia Flash	Yes	Yes
AIFF	Yes	No
3GPP	Yes	Yes
MP4	Yes	Yes
uLaw	Yes	Yes
aLaw	Yes	Yes
Dialogic VOX	Yes	Yes
OGG	Yes	Yes
RealMedia Audio	Yes	Yes
Microsoft WMA	Yes	Yes
Microsoft AVI	Yes	No
Microsoft Wave	Yes	Yes

== Dependency ==
RetroCode depends on a variety of open source libraries as well as some ISO reference implementations.

- id3lib Version 3.8.3
- faac
- faad2
- mp4ff part of faad2, patched for 3GPP compatibility
- zlib
- amrnb
- amrwb
- mp3lame
- mad
- avformat
- avcodec
- avutil
- qscl
- mpeg4ip
