= Labelling =

Technique of describing someone or something in a word or short phrase

Labelling or using a label is describing someone or something in a word or short phrase. For example, the label "criminal" may be used to describe someone who has broken a law. Labelling theory is a theory in sociology which ascribes labelling of people to control and identification of deviant behaviour. It has been argued that labelling is necessary for communication. However, the use of the term is often intended to highlight the fact that the label is a description applied from the outside, rather than something intrinsic to the labelled thing. This can be done for several reasons:

- To provoke a discussion about what the best description is
- To reject a particular label
- To reject the whole idea that the labelled thing can be described in a short phrase.

This last usage can be seen as an accusation that such a short description is overly-reductive.

Giving something a label can be seen as positive, but the term label is not usually used in this case. For example, giving a name to a common identity is seen as essential in identity politics.

Labelling is often equivalent to pigeonholing or the use of stereotypes and can suffer from the same problems as these activities.

The labelling of people can be related to a reference group. For example, the labels black and white are related to black people and white people; the labels young and old are related to young people and old people.

The labelling of works of art can be related to genre. For example, a piece of music may be described as progressive rock or indie or ragga jungle drum and bass. However, there are other labels that can be applied to a work, such as derivative, low or high. The use of the word labelling is less common in the context of works of art than people. However, it also often represents the rejection of a label. For example, an artist may feel that the labeller is attempting to restrict the scope of the artist's work to that which is covered by the label.

== On the internet ==
Labelling on the web represents the chunks of information in information environments, where labelling is perhaps the most obvious way to show a site's organization schemes across multiple systems and contexts.

Labelling systems are one of the major components in information architecture, and one of the first steps of an information architecture project is to identify, organize and label relevant chunks of information. When creating labels, the goal is to communicate efficiently, and without taking up too much space. Labels should be written in a language that's familiar to the users, and in a way that they will detect new and recognize similar concepts.

In an information environment, labels are either textual or iconic.

=== Textual labels ===
Contextual links are hyperlinks to information on other pages or another location on the same page, and need to draw meaning from their surrounding text.

Labels are often used as headings to present subsequent information and create a hierarchy within contents. A hierarchical relationship between headings is established visually through consistent use of numbering, font size, color and styles, white spaces, indentation, or a combination of these items.

When used in a navigation system there is no standard, but common categories might be:

- Main, Main Page, Home
- Search, Find, Browse, Search/Browse
- Site Map, Contents, Table of contents, Index
- Contact, Contact Us
- Help, FAQ,
- News, News and events, News and announcements, Announcements
- About, About us, About, Who we are.

Index terms are often referred to as keywords, tags, descriptive metadata, taxonomies, controlled vocabularies, and thesauri. Such labelling systems can describe any type of content such as sites, subsites, pages, or content chunks.

=== Iconic labels ===
Icons can serve as a substitute for text to represent information. Iconic labels are used as navigation systems, especially in mobile apps, where screen space is constrained.

== Labelling in science ==
Mario Bunge (1967) rejected labelling (labeling) as 'name calling' and 'pseudo-explanation'. Furthermore, he observed that it 'is conspicuous in ideological debate, in pseudoscience, and even in the early stages of science (protoscience).'

== See also ==
- Archetype
- Association fallacy
- Attributional bias
- Discrimination
- Infrahumanisation
- Labelling theory
- Loser
- Pigeonholing
- Role suction
- Slut-shaming
- Social stigma
- Stereotype
