= 8SVX =

File format

8-Bit Sampled Voice (8SVX)
- Filename extension: .8svx, .iff
- Internet media type: audio/8svx, audio/x-8svx
- Type code: 8SVX
- Developed by: Electronic Arts and Commodore International
- Initial release: 1985
- Type of format: audio file format, container format
- Extended from: IFF
- Extended to: 16SVX, MAUD

8-Bit Sampled Voice (8SVX) is an audio file format standard developed by Electronic Arts for the Amiga computer series. It is a data subtype of the IFF file container format. It typically contains linear pulse-code modulation (LPCM) digital audio.

== Description ==
The 8SVX subtype stores 8-bit audio data within chunks contained within an IFF file container. 8SVX subtypes can exist alone within IFF file containers (audio only), or can be multiplexed together with other IFF subtypes, such as video animation streams.

Metadata about the 8SVX data stream is contained in separate descriptor chunks that come prior to the main data body chunk. Sample rate, volume and compression type are described in a VHDR chunk. Various other chunks are available to describe the name, author and copyright.

8SVX supports features such as attack, release and section repeat, which are useful for storage of musical instrument samples.

An example layout of an audio-only 8SVX IFF audio file:

FORM

8SVX

VHDR
NAME
BODY

== Encoding ==
The majority of 8SVX data streams are encoded using uncompressed linear PCM streams. Optionally, Fibonacci-delta lossy data compression is also available, resulting in a 50% compression ratio at the cost of decreased fidelity. Multi-byte values are stored in big-endian format, the native byte order for the Motorola 68000 family.

== Support ==
IFF-8SVX encoded audio was the default audio format for the Commodore Amiga. Most audio programs for the Amiga supported the format. AmigaOS 3.0 introduced a multimedia framework using the datatype subsystem that included an 8SVX decoder (8SVX.datatype).

Many sound editing programs and music tracker programs of the late 1980s and early 1990s supported the format. It is still a common format for cross-platform audio editing programs (such as Sound eXchange).

8SVX support is also available to modern programs via libavcodec (and the related ffdshow codec package) as well as via libsndfile.

== Legacy ==
The Commodore Amiga computer series never received native hardware support for 16-bit digital audio before the decline of the platform. As such, the related 16SVX and MAUD subtypes never saw wide adoption.

Apple Computer developed a separate subtype known as AIFF which included support for 16-bit samples and additional compression types. It superseded 8SVX as the dominant audio subtype for IFF files.

Microsoft and IBM co-developed the RIFF file container and the related WAVE audio subtype for Windows. Both formats are heavily influenced by the IFF/8SVX container format, but like AIFF, were extended to support higher bit-depths and additional compression types.

== See also ==
- AIFF
- IFF File Format
- WAV
- Paula, the digital audio processor for the Commodore Amiga computer
