= CRNG =

CRNG may refer to:

- Cryptographic random number generator, in computing
- CRNG, the colour range chunk of the ILBM image file format
