= Raw audio format =

File format for uncompressed audio

A raw audio file is any file containing un-containerized and uncompressed audio. The data is stored as raw pulse-code modulation (PCM) values without any metadata header information (such as sampling rate, bit depth, endian, or number of channels).

== Extensions ==
Raw files can have a wide range of file extensions, common ones being .raw, .pcm, or .sam. They can also have no extension.

== Playing ==
As there is no header, compatible audio players require information from the user that would normally be stored in a header, such as the encoding, sample rate, number of bits used per sample, and the number of channels.
