= File format =

Structure of information stored on a computer

wav-file: 2.1 megabytes.

ogg-file: 154 kilobytes.

A file format is the way that information is encoded for storage in a computer file. It may describe the encoding at various levels of abstraction including low-level bit and byte layout as well high-level organization such as markup and tabular structure. A file format may be standardized (which can be proprietary or open) or it can be an ad hoc convention.

Some file formats are designed for very particular types of data: PNG files, for example, store bitmapped images using lossless data compression. Other file formats, however, are designed for storage of several different types of data: the Ogg format can act as a container for different types of multimedia including any combination of audio and video, with or without text (such as subtitles), and metadata. A text file can contain any stream of characters, including possible control characters, and is encoded in one of various character encoding schemes. Some file formats, such as HTML, scalable vector graphics, and the source code of computer software are text files with defined syntaxes that allow them to be used for specific purposes.

== Specification ==
Some file formats have a published specification describing the format and possibly how to verify the correctness of data in that format. Such a document is not available for every format (sometimes because the format is considered a trade secret, and sometimes because a document was not authored). Sometimes, a format is defined de facto by the behavior of the program that accesses the file.

If there is no specification available, a developer might reverse engineer the format by inspecting files in that format or acquire the specification for a fee and by signing a non-disclosure agreement. Due to the time and money cost of these approaches, file formats with publicly available specifications tend to be supported by more programs.

== Intellectual property protection ==
Patent law (rather than copyright) can be used to protect the intellectual property inherent in a file format. Although a patent for a file format is not directly permitted under US law, some formats encode data using a patented algorithm. For example, prior to 2004, using compression with the GIF file format required the use of a patented algorithm, and though the patent owner did not initially enforce their patent, they later began collecting royalty fees. This has resulted in a significant decrease in the use of GIFs, and is partly responsible for the development of the alternative PNG format. However, the GIF patent expired in the US in mid-2003, and worldwide in mid-2004.

== Identification ==
Both users and applications need to identify a file's format so that the file can be used appropriately. Generally, the methods for identification vary by operating system, with each approach having its advantages and disadvantages.

=== Filename extension ===
One popular method used by many operating systems, including Windows, macOS, CP/M, MS-DOS, VMS, and VM/CMS, is to indicate the format of a file with a suffix of the file name, known as the extension. For example, an HTML document is identified by a file name that ends with .html or .htm, and a GIF image by .gif.

In the now-antiquated FAT file system, file names were limited to eight characters for the base name plus a three-character extension, known as an 8.3 filename. Due to the prevalence of this naming scheme, many formats still use three-character extensions even though modern systems support longer extensions. Since there is no standardized list of extensions, more than one format can use the same extension – especially for three-letter extensions since there is a limited number of three-letter combinations. This situation can confuse both users and applications.

One implication of indicating the file type with the extension is that the users and applications can be tricked into treating a file as a different format simply by renaming it. For example, an HTML file can be treated as plain text by adding (or changing the existing) extension filename.txt. Although this strategy is useful, it can be confusing to less technical users who accidentally make a file unusable (or "lose" it). To try to avoid this scenario, Windows and macOS support hiding the extension.

Hiding the extension, however, can create the appearance of multiple files with the same name in the same folder, which is confusing for people. For example, an image may be needed both in .eps format (for publishing) and .png format (for web sites) and one might name them with the same base name (for example, CompanyLogo.eps and CompanyLogo.png). With extensions hidden they appear to have the same name: CompanyLogo.

Hiding extensions can also pose a security risk. For example, a malicious user could create an executable program with an innocent name such as "Holiday photo.jpg.exe". The ".exe" would be hidden and an unsuspecting user would see "Holiday photo.jpg", which would appear to be a JPEG image, usually unable to harm the machine. However, the operating system would still see the ".exe" extension and run the program, which would then be able to cause harm to the computer. The same is true with files with only one extension: as it is not shown to the user, no information about the file can be deduced without explicitly investigating the file. To further trick users, it is possible to store an icon inside the program, in which case some operating systems' icon assignment for the executable file (.exe) would be overridden with an icon commonly used to represent JPEG images, making the program look like an image. Extensions can also be spoofed: some Microsoft Word macro viruses create a Word file in template format and save it with a .doc extension. Since Word generally ignores extensions and looks at the format of the file, these would open as templates, execute, and spread the virus. This represents a practical problem for Windows systems where extension-hiding is turned on by default.

=== Internal metadata ===
A file's format may be indicated inside the file itself – either as information intended for this purpose or as identifiable data within the format that can be used for identification even though that is not its intended purpose.

Often intentionally placed information is located at the beginning of a file since this is relatively easy to read from a file both by users and applications. When the information at the beginning of the file is a structure that contains other metadata, then the structure is often called a file header. When the file starts with a relatively small datum that only indicates the format, then it is often called a magic number.

==== File header ====
The metadata contained in a file header are usually stored at the start of the file, but might be present in other areas too, often including the end, depending on the file format or the type of data contained. Character-based (text) files usually have character-based headers, whereas binary formats usually have binary headers, although this is not a rule. Text-based file headers usually take up more space, but being human-readable, they can easily be examined by using simple software such as a text editor or a hexadecimal editor.

As well as indicating the file format, file headers may contain metadata about the file and its contents. For example, most image files store information about image format, size, resolution and color space, and optionally authoring information such as who made the image, when and where it was made, what camera model and photographic settings were used (Exif), and so on. Such metadata may be used by software reading or interpreting the file during the loading process and afterwards.

File headers may be used by an operating system to quickly gather information about a file without loading it all into memory, but doing so uses more of a computer's resources than reading directly from the directory information. For instance, when a graphic file manager has to display the contents of a folder, it must read the headers of many files before it can display the appropriate icons, but these will be located in different places on the storage medium thus taking longer to access. A folder containing many files with complex metadata such as thumbnail information may require considerable time before it can be displayed.

If a header is binary hard-coded such that the header itself needs complex interpretation in order to be recognized, especially for metadata content protection's sake, there is a risk that the file format can be misinterpreted. It may even have been badly written at the source. This can result in corrupt metadata which, in extremely bad cases, might even render the file unreadable.

A more complex example of file headers are those used for wrapper (or container) file formats.

==== Magic number ====
One way to incorporate file type metadata is to store a "magic number" inside the file itself. Originally, this term was used for 2-byte identifiers at the start of files, but since any binary sequence can be regarded as a number, any feature of a file format which uniquely distinguishes it can be used for identification. GIF images, for instance, always begin with the ASCII representation of either GIF87a or GIF89a, depending upon the standard to which they adhere. Many file types, especially plain-text files, are harder to spot by this method. HTML files, for example, might begin with the string <html> (which is not case sensitive), or an appropriate document type definition that starts with <!DOCTYPE html, or, for XHTML, the XML identifier, which begins with <?xml. The files can also begin with HTML comments, random text, or several empty lines, but still be usable HTML.

The magic number approach offers better guarantees that the format will be identified correctly, and can often determine more precise information about the file. Since reasonably reliable "magic number" tests can be fairly complex, and each file must effectively be tested against every possibility in the magic database, this approach is relatively inefficient, especially for displaying large lists of files (in contrast, file name and metadata-based methods need to check only one piece of data, and match it against a sorted index). Also, data must be read from the file itself, increasing latency as opposed to metadata stored in the directory. Where file types do not lend themselves to recognition in this way, the system must fall back to metadata. It is, however, the best way for a program to check if the file it has been told to process is of the correct format: while the file's name or metadata may be altered independently of its content, failing a well-designed magic number test is a pretty sure sign that the file is either corrupt or of the wrong type. On the other hand, a valid magic number does not guarantee that the file is not corrupt or is of a correct type.

So-called shebang lines in script files are a special case of magic numbers. There, the magic number consists of human-readable text within the file that identifies a specific interpreter and options to be passed to it.

Another operating system using magic numbers is AmigaOS, where magic numbers were called "Magic Cookies" and were adopted as a standard system to recognize executables in Hunk executable file format and also to let single programs, tools and utilities deal automatically with their saved data files, or any other kind of file types when saving and loading data. This system was then enhanced with the Amiga standard Datatype recognition system. Another method was the FourCC method, originating in OSType on Macintosh, later adapted by Interchange File Format (IFF) and derivatives.

=== External metadata ===
A final way of storing the format of a file is to explicitly store information about the format in the file system, rather than within the file itself.

This approach keeps the metadata separate from both the main data and the name, but is also less portable than either filename extensions or "magic numbers", since the format has to be converted from filesystem to filesystem. While this is also true to an extent with filename extensions— for instance, for compatibility with MS-DOS's three character limit— most forms of storage have a roughly equivalent definition of a file's data and name, but may have varying or no representation of further metadata.

Note that zip files and other archive files solve the problem of handling metadata. A utility program collects multiple files together along with metadata about each file and the folders/directories they came from all within one new file (e.g. a zip file with extension .zip). The new file is also compressed and possibly encrypted, but now is transmissible as a single file across operating systems by FTP transmissions or sent by email as an attachment. At the destination, the single file received has to be unzipped by a compatible utility to be useful. The problems of handling metadata are solved this way using zip files or archive files.

==== Mac OS type-codes ====
The Mac OS' Hierarchical File System and HFS+ file system, and the Apple File System, store codes for creator and type as part of the directory entry for each file. These codes are referred to as OSTypes. These codes could be any 4-byte sequence but were often selected so that the ASCII representation formed a sequence of meaningful characters, such as an abbreviation of the application's name or the developer's initials. For instance a HyperCard "stack" file has a creator of WILD (from Hypercard's previous name, "WildCard") and a type of STAK. The BBEdit text editor has a creator code of R*ch referring to its original programmer, Rich Siegel. The type code specifies the format of the file, while the creator code specifies the default program to open it with when double-clicked by the user. For example, the user could have several text files all with the type code of TEXT, but each open in a different program, due to having differing creator codes. This feature was intended so that, for example, human-readable plain-text files could be opened in a general-purpose text editor, while programming or HTML code files would open in a specialized editor or IDE. However, this feature was often the source of user confusion, as which program would launch when the files were double-clicked was often unpredictable.

RISC OS uses a similar system, consisting of a 12-bit number which can be looked up in a table of descriptions—e.g. the hexadecimal number FF5 is "aliased" to PoScript, representing a PostScript file.

==== macOS uniform type identifiers (UTIs) ====
A Uniform Type Identifier (UTI) is a method used in macOS for uniquely identifying "typed" classes of entities, such as file formats. It was developed by Apple as a replacement for OSType (type & creator codes).

The UTI is a Core Foundation string, which uses a reverse-DNS string. Some common and standard types use a domain called public (e.g. public.png for a Portable Network Graphics image), while other domains can be used for third-party types (e.g. com.adobe.pdf for Portable Document Format). UTIs can be defined within a hierarchical structure, known as a conformance hierarchy. Thus, public.png conforms to a supertype of public.image, which itself conforms to a supertype of public.data. A UTI can exist in multiple hierarchies, which provides great flexibility.

In addition to file formats, UTIs can also be used for other entities which can exist in macOS, including:

- Pasteboard data
- Folders (directories)
- Translatable types (as handled by the Translation Manager)
- Bundles
- Frameworks
- Streaming data
- Aliases and symlinks

==== VSAM Catalog ====
In IBM OS/VS through z/OS, the VSAM catalog (prior to ICF catalogs) and the VSAM Volume Record in the VSAM Volume Data Set (VVDS) (with ICF catalogs) identifies the type of VSAM dataset.

==== VTOC ====
In IBM OS/360 through z/OS, a format 1 or 7 Data Set Control Block (DSCB) in the Volume Table of Contents (VTOC) identifies the Dataset Organization (DSORG) of the dataset described by it.

==== OS/2 extended attributes ====
The HPFS, FAT12, and FAT16 (but not FAT32) filesystems allow the storage of "extended attributes" with files. These comprise an arbitrary set of triplets with a name, a coded type for the value, and a value, where the names are unique and values can be up to 64 KB long. There are standardized meanings for certain types and names (under OS/2). One such is that the ".TYPE" extended attribute is used to determine the file type. Its value comprises a list of one or more file types associated with the file, each of which is a string, such as "Plain Text" or "HTML document". Thus a file may have several types.

The NTFS filesystem also allows storage of OS/2 extended attributes, as one of the file forks, but this feature is merely present to support the OS/2 subsystem (not present in XP), so the Win32 subsystem treats this information as an opaque block of data and does not use it. Instead, it relies on other file forks to store meta-information in Win32-specific formats. OS/2 extended attributes can still be read and written by Win32 programs, but the data must be entirely parsed by applications.

==== POSIX extended attributes ====
On Unix and Unix-like systems, the ext2, ext3, ext4, ReiserFS version 3, XFS, JFS, FFS, and HFS+ filesystems allow the storage of extended attributes with files. These include an arbitrary list of "name=value" strings, where the names are unique and a value can be accessed through its related name.

==== PRONOM unique identifiers (PUIDs) ====
The PRONOM Persistent Unique Identifier (PUID) is an extensible scheme of persistent, unique, and unambiguous identifiers for file formats, which has been developed by The National Archives of the UK as part of its PRONOM technical registry service. PUIDs can be expressed as Uniform Resource Identifiers using the info:pronom/ namespace. Although not yet widely used outside of the UK government and some digital preservation programs, the PUID scheme does provide greater granularity than most alternative schemes.

==== MIME types ====
MIME types are widely used in many Internet-related applications, and increasingly elsewhere, although their usage for on-disc type information is rare. These consist of a standardised system of identifiers (managed by IANA) consisting of a type and a sub-type, separated by a slash—for instance, text/html or image/gif. These were originally intended as a way of identifying what type of file was attached to an e-mail, independent of the source and target operating systems. MIME types identify files on BeOS, AmigaOS 4.0 and MorphOS, as well as store unique application signatures for application launching. In AmigaOS and MorphOS, the Mime type system works in parallel with Amiga specific Datatype system.

There are problems with the MIME types though; several organizations and people have created their own MIME types without registering them properly with IANA, which makes the use of this standard awkward in some cases.

==== File format identifiers (FFIDs) ====
File format identifiers are another, not widely used way to identify file formats according to their origin and their file category. It was created for the Description Explorer suite of software. It is composed of several digits of the form NNNNNNNNN-XX-YYYYYYY. The first part indicates the organization origin/maintainer (this number represents a value in a company/standards organization database), and the 2 following digits categorize the type of file in hexadecimal. The final part is composed of the usual filename extension of the file or the international standard number of the file, padded left with zeros. For example, the PNG file specification has the FFID of 000000001-31-0015948 where 31 indicates an image file, 0015948 is the standard number and 000000001 indicates the International Organization for Standardization (ISO).

=== File content based format identification ===
Another less popular way to identify the file format is to examine the file contents for distinguishable patterns among file types. The contents of a file are a sequence of bytes and a byte has 256 unique permutations (0–255). Thus, counting the occurrence of byte patterns that is often referred to as byte frequency distribution gives distinguishable patterns to identify file types. There are many content-based file type identification schemes that use a byte frequency distribution to build the representative models for file type and use any statistical and data mining techniques to identify file types.

== File structure ==
There are several types of ways to structure data in a file. The most usual ones are described below.

=== Unstructured formats (raw memory dumps) ===
Earlier file formats used raw data formats that consisted of directly dumping the memory images of one or more structures into the file.

This has several drawbacks. Unless the memory images also have reserved spaces for future extensions, extending and improving this type of structured file is very difficult. It also creates files that might be specific to one platform or programming language (for example a structure containing a Pascal string is not recognized as such in C). On the other hand, developing tools for reading and writing these types of files is very simple.

The limitations of the unstructured formats led to the development of other types of file formats that could be easily extended and be backward compatible at the same time.

=== Chunk-based formats ===
In this kind of file structure, each piece of data is embedded in a container that somehow identifies the data. The container's scope can be identified by start- and end-markers of some kind, by an explicit length field somewhere, or by fixed requirements of the file format's definition.

Throughout the 1970s, many programs used formats of this general kind. For example, word-processors such as troff, Script, and Scribe, and database export files such as CSV. Electronic Arts and Commodore-Amiga also used this type of file format in 1985, with their IFF (Interchange File Format) file format.

A container is sometimes called a "chunk", although "chunk" may also imply that each piece is small, and/or that chunks do not contain other chunks; many formats do not impose those requirements.

The information that identifies a particular "chunk" may be called many different things, often terms including "field name", "identifier", "label", or "tag". The identifiers are often human-readable, and classify parts of the data: for example, as a "surname", "address", "rectangle", "font name", etc. These are not the same thing as identifiers in the sense of a database key or serial number (although an identifier may well identify its associated data as such a key).

With this type of file structure, tools that do not know certain chunk identifiers simply skip those that they do not understand. Depending on the actual meaning of the skipped data, this may or may not be useful (CSS explicitly defines such behavior).

This concept has been used again and again by RIFF (Microsoft-IBM equivalent of IFF), PNG, JPEG storage, DER (Distinguished Encoding Rules) encoded streams and files (which were originally described in CCITT X.409:1984 and therefore predate IFF), and Structured Data Exchange Format (SDXF).

Indeed, any data format must somehow identify the significance of its component parts, and embedded boundary-markers are an obvious way to do so:

- MIME headers do this with a colon-separated label at the start of each logical line. MIME headers cannot contain other MIME headers, though the data content of some headers has sub-parts that can be extracted by other conventions.
- CSV and similar files often do this using a header records with field names, and with commas to mark the field boundaries. Like MIME, CSV has no provision for structures with more than one level.
- XML and its kin can be loosely considered a kind of chunk-based format, since data elements are identified by markup that is akin to chunk identifiers. However, it has formal advantages such as schemas and validation, as well as the ability to represent more complex structures such as trees, DAGs, and charts. If XML is considered a "chunk" format, then SGML and its predecessor IBM GML are among the earliest examples of such formats.
- JSON is similar to XML without schemas, cross-references, or a definition for the meaning of repeated field-names, and is often convenient for programmers.
- YAML is similar to JSON, but use indentation to separate data chunks and aim to be more human-readable than JSON or XML.
- Protocol Buffers are in turn similar to JSON, notably replacing boundary-markers in the data with field numbers, which are mapped to/from names by some external mechanism.

=== Directory-based formats ===
This is another extensible format, that closely resembles a file system (OLE Documents are actual filesystems), where the file is composed of 'directory entries' that contain the location of the data within the file itself as well as its signatures (and in certain cases its type). Good examples of these types of file structures are disk images, executables, OLE documents TIFF, libraries.

Some file formats like ODT and DOCX, being PKZIP-based, are both chunked and carry a directory.

The structure of a directory-based file format lends itself to modifications more easily than unstructured or chunk-based formats. The nature of this type of format allows users to carefully construct files that causes reader software to do things the authors of the format never intended to happen. An example of this is the zip bomb. Directory-based file formats also use values that point at other areas in the file but if some later data value points back at data that was read earlier, it can result in an infinite loop for any reader software that assumes the input file is valid and blindly follows the loop.

== See also ==
- Audio file format
- Chemical file format
- Comparison of executable file formats
- Digital container format
- Document file format
- DROID file format identification utility
- File (command), a file type identification utility
- File conversion
- Future proofing
- Graphics file format summary
- Image file formats
- Information architecture
- List of archive formats
- List of file formats
- List of file signatures, or "magic numbers"
- List of filename extensions (alphabetical)
- List of free file formats
- List of motion and gesture file formats
- Magic number (programming)
- Object file
- Video file format
- Windows file types
- Filename extension
