= Dialogic ADPCM =

Dialogic ADPCM or VOX is an audio file format, optimized for storing digitized voice data at a low sampling rate. VOX files are most commonly found in telephony applications, as well as an occasional arcade redemption game. It uses a lossy compression algorithm, optimized for voice, not high fidelity.

Similar to other ADPCM (Adaptive Differential Pulse Code Modulation) formats, Dialogic ADPCM compresses audio data into a series of 4-bit samples. The original Dialogic ADPCM paper (linked to below) does not specify or mention a recording or playback frequency; it may be at the implementer discretion. However, traditionally, files commonly have a sampling rate of 6000 or 8000 samples per second, but 8000 samples per second (8000 Hz) is more common. 8000 Hz matches the sampling rate used in G.711 voice systems such as DS1.

Unlike a WAV file, a VOX file does not contain a header to specify the encoding format or the sampling rate, so this information must be known in order to play the file. If not known, it is normally assumed that a VOX file is encoded with Dialogic ADPCM at a sampling rate of 8000 Hz. It is possible that a VOX file may be encoded in a format other than Dialogic ADPCM, but this is not common.

Dialogic ADPCM is an open file format. It matches ITU-T standard G.721, later superseded by G.726.

The algorithm for Dialogic ADPCM was developed by Oki Electric, which also produced ICs such as the Oki Semiconductor MSM7580 to implement the algorithm in hardware. These ICs were used on popular telephony interface cards manufactured by Dialogic Corporation for use in voicemail and similar systems. As this was the most common use for the file format, it became known as "Dialogic ADPCM."

Some early BlackBerry phones that don't support MP3 format (e.g. 7100) used that codec for sound files which had ADP filetype extension. These must be of max filesize of 128 Kbytes or less.

ADP filetype extension were being just renamed VOX filetype extension. The AD4 extension is also used for files compressed using "Dialogic ADPCM" with a sample rate of 36000 Hz. This means that .ad4 files can be decoded if imported as VOX ADPCM with a sample rate set to 36 kHz on software that allows such settings, like e.g. Audacity.
