= Neuroimaging Informatics Technology Initiative =

Open file format for brain imaging data

- Filename extension: .nii, .nii.gz, .hdr/.img
- Initial release: 2 September 2003; 21 years ago
- Latest release: 2.0
- Open format?: Yes
- Website: nifti.nimh.nih.gov

The Neuroimaging Informatics Technology Initiative (NIfTI) is an open file format commonly used to store brain imaging data obtained using Magnetic Resonance Imaging methods.
