= In Search of Dr. Riptide =

1994 video game

- Developer(s): MindStorm Software
- Publisher(s): Pack Media
- Designer(s): Raoul Said
- Composer(s): Dan Froelich
- Platform(s): MS-DOS
- Release: 1994
- Genre(s): Scrolling shooter
- Mode(s): Single-player

In Search of Dr. Riptide is a multidirectional scrolling shooter developed by MindStorm Software for MS-DOS compatible operating systems and published by Pack Media in 1994. It is set in the Great Barrier Reef of Australia.

== Plot ==
Dr. Riptide is hell-bent on turning all of the world's marine life into high-protein slurry, and must be stopped. Nick, a secret naval agent, must navigate his way through both natural caves and man-carved tunnels in order to find Dr. Riptide.

Nick battles many aquatic creatures including two giant marine life-based monsters, Oscar the giant bionic fish and Otis the giant octopus. On his journey he travels through the chambers and ruins of a Greco-Roman Lost City of Atlantis. All the while, Nick salvages for oxygen, ammunition, weapons and gold coins.

Eventually Nick makes his way deep underwater, under many feet of coral, to the metal-encased laboratories of Dr. Riptide. There he battles the nefarious Doctor, who pilots a large, weapon-equipped submarine. Nick defeats Dr. Riptide, Riptide's submarine breaks down, and Nick tows him away to the authorities.

== Gameplay ==
Nick uses two subs on his search. The main sub can be upgraded with four levels of torpedoes, a surfacing missile weapon and a utility that allows the main sub and JASON sub to attack simultaneously. The main sub picks up all items, while the JASON sub can only pick up treasures.

The JASON sub is much smaller than the main sub and can be used to explore gaps too small for the main sub to enter and it can be used to completely evade the deadly octopus tentacles. The JASON sub has a power level indicating the limited time the JASON sub can part from the main sub. The JASON sub must reunite with main sub to recharge its power. The JASON can only reach the second torpedo level.

To survive Nick must have oxygen. The oxygen level can be recharged by collecting oxygen items or surfacing the main sub. Collecting a shield item increases the shield level, but it decreases the torpedo weapon by one level. The pulse cannon can be obtained by collecting four parts (one from each following level). The pulse cannon is powerful, but it uses up oxygen. In most levels, the green key must be collected to access the route to the exit. Treasures can be found either floating around or contained in barrels and chests. When faced by a boss in each episode, a weak point must be hit repeatedly to destroy it.

== Reception ==
Reception

Review scores
Publication	Score
Computer Player	6/10
Gambler	65%

Jeff James of Computer Player wrote, "It might not be the underwater equal of Ecco the Dolphin (cartridge game for the Sega Genesis), but it's definitely worth a few minutes of download time." He felt that "younger gamers should thoroughly enjoy" Riptide.
