= Creative Voice file =

Audio format for digital audio data

VOC
- Filename extension: .voc
- Internet media type: audio / x-voc
- Developed by: Creative Technology

Creative Voice, filename extension .voc, is an audio format for digital audio data developed in the 1990s Sound Blaster sound cards from Creative Technology.

== Construction ==
=== Original 8-bit format ===
The file format consists of a 26-byte header and a series of subsequent data blocks containing the audio information. The byte order is little-endian.

VOC header
Offset (hex)	Length (in bytes)	Content
0x00	19	ASCII stringCreative Voice File
0x13	1	0x1A (EOF)
0x14	2	Starting byte of first data block (usually 0x1A00 for a little-endian value of 26)
0x16	2	[Version] (major, minor), hexadecimal, e.g. 0x010a, version 1.10
0x18	2	Validation: ~version + 0x1234, hexadecimal, truncated to 16 bits, e.g. 0x1129

The header is followed by data blocks. Each data block begins with a type byte describing the contents of the data, followed by 3 bytes for the size of the data. For two of the 9 defined types, the subsequent size of the data is missing, so the block ultimately consists of only a single byte – these are 0x00 terminator, and 0x07 repeat end.

If a size is specified, the first 4 bytes will be followed by a block of the content resulting from the specified type with the specified size.

VOC data block
Type (hex)	Type description	Size (3 bytes)	Info
0x00	Terminator	–	–
0x01	Sound data	2 + size of the data	Audio content: Offset / Description / Meaning; 0x00 / Sampling rate / 256-(1000000/sample rate); 0x01 / Codec / see table is ignored if a block of type 0x08 (extra info) defines a codec (from version 1.20); from 0x02 / Audio data in the specified format (codec)
0x02	Sound continue	Size of the data	additional audio data in the same format as the previous block
0x03	Silence	3	Silence: Offset / Description / Meaning; 0x00-01 / Length of silence in the unit of the sampling rate / Integer -1; 0x02 / sampling rate / as with audio content
0x04	Marker	2	Marker number (2 bytes): remains in an intermediate memory during playback and can be jumped on again.
0x05	ASCII string	Length of the string	Null-terminated string
0x06	Repeat	2	Number of repetitions (2-byte integer) 0x0000to 0xFFFE1-65,535 repetitions, 0xFFFFfor infinite
0x07	End repeat	–	–
0x08	Extended	4	–

The file optionally ends with the terminator block (data block of type 0x00).

== Use ==
Creative Voice files were used in various DOS games when they could use sound blaster cards for audio output, such as In Search of Dr. Riptide.

The spread of the file format disappeared noticeably with the advent of RIFF WAVE, which was already supported in Windows. However, the Creative Voice file format required the installation of additional player programs included with the Sound Blaster Card drivers. With the advent of AC'97, WAVE, file extension .WAV, finally prevailed.
