= Chunk (information) =

A chunk is a fragment of information which is used in many multimedia file formats, such as PNG, IFF, MP3 and AVI.

Each chunk contains a header which indicates some parameters (e.g. the type of chunk, comments, size etc.). Following the header is a variable area containing data, which is decoded by the program from the parameters in the header.

Chunks may also be fragments of information which are downloaded or managed by P2P programs.

In distributed computing, a chunk is a set of data which is sent to a processor or one of the parts of a computer for processing.

== See also ==
- Chunking (computing), a procedure for memory allocation or message transmission in computer programming
- Retrieval-augmented generation § Chunking
