= Pro Tools =

Digital audio workstation

- Original authors: Evan Brooks; Peter Gotcher
- Developer: Avid Audio under Avid Technology (previously Digidesign)
- Release: January 20, 1989; 37 years ago
- Stable release: Pro Tools 2026.11.1 / November 18, 2026; 0 days ago
- Written in: C, C++, Assembly
- Operating system: macOS, Windows
- Available in: 8 languages
- List of languages Chinese (Traditional and Simplified), English, French, German, Japanese, Korean, Spanish
- Type: Digital audio workstation
- License: Proprietary (software-as-a-service)
- Website: www.avid.com/pro-tools

Pro Tools is a digital audio workstation (DAW) developed and released by Avid Technology (formerly Digidesign) for Microsoft Windows and macOS. It is used for music creation and production, sound for picture (sound design, audio post-production and mixing) and, more generally, sound recording, editing, and mastering processes.

Pro Tools operates both as standalone software and in conjunction with a range of external analog-to-digital converters and PCIe cards with on-board digital signal processors (DSP). The DSP is used to provide additional processing power to the host computer for processing real-time effects, such as reverb, equalization, and compression and to obtain lower latency audio performance. Like all digital audio workstation software, Pro Tools can perform the functions of a multitrack tape recorder and a mixing console along with additional features that can only be performed in the digital domain, such as non-linear and non-destructive editing (most of audio handling is done without overwriting the source files), track compositing with multiple playlists, time compression and expansion, pitch shifting, and faster-than-real-time mixdown.

Audio, MIDI, and video tracks are graphically represented on a timeline. Audio effects, virtual instruments, and hardware emulators—such as microphone preamps or guitar amplifiers—can be added, adjusted, and processed in real-time in a virtual mixer. 16-bit, 24-bit, and 32-bit float audio bit depths at sample rates up to 192 kHz are supported. Pro Tools supports mixed bit depths and audio formats in a session: BWF/WAV (including WAVE Extensible, RF64 and BW64) and AIFF. It imports and exports MOV video files and ADM BWF files (audio files with Dolby Atmos metadata); it also imports MXF, ACID and REX files and the lossy formats MP3, AAC, M4A, and audio from video files (MOV, MP4, M4V). The legacy SDII format was dropped with Pro Tools 10, although SDII conversion is still possible on macOS.

Pro Tools has incorporated video editing capabilities. Users can import and manipulate 4K and HD video file formats such as DNxHR, DNxHD, ProRes and more, either as MXF files or QuickTime MOV. It features timecode, tempo maps, elastic audio, and automation; supports mixing in surround sound, Dolby Atmos and VR sound using Ambisonics.

The Pro Tools TDM mix engine, supported until 2011 with version 10, employed 24-bit fixed-point arithmetic for plug-in processing and 48-bit for mixing. Current HDX hardware systems, HD Native and native systems use 32-bit floating-point resolution for plug-ins and 64-bit floating-point summing. The software and the audio engine were adapted to 64-bit architecture from version 11.

In 2015 with version 12.0, Avid added the subscription license model in addition to perpetual licenses. In 2022, Avid briefly stopped selling Pro Tools perpetual licenses, forcing users to subscription licenses to a subscription model. After considerable customer uproar, in 2023 Avid reintroduced selling perpetual licenses via resellers. Pro Tools subscription plans include Artist, which costs $9.99 per month or $99 per year; Pro Tools Studio, which costs $39.99 per month or $299 per year; and Pro Tools Flex, which costs $99.99 per month or $999 per year. Later in 2022, Avid launched a free version: Pro Tools Intro.

In 2004, Pro Tools was inducted into the TECnology Hall of Fame, an honor given to "products and innovations that have had an enduring impact on the development of audio technology."

== History ==
Pro Tools milestones
1985	Sound Designer
1986
1987	Sound Designer Universal (1.5)
1988
1989	Sound Tools
1989	Sound Designer II
1990
1991	Pro Tools
1992	Sound Tools II
1993	Pro Tools II
1994	Pro Tools TDM
1994	Pro Tools III
1995
1996	Pro Tools PCI
1997	Pro Tools 4
1997	Pro Tools | 24
1998	Pro Tools | 24 MIX
1999	Pro Tools 5
1999	Pro Tools LE
2000
2001	Pro Tools Free
2002	Pro Tools | HD
2003	Pro Tools 6
2004
2005	Pro Tools 7
2006
2007
2008	Pro Tools 8
2009
2010	Pro Tools 9
2011	Pro Tools | HDX
2011	Pro Tools 10
2012
2013	Pro Tools 11
2014
2015	Pro Tools 12
2015	Pro Tools | First
2016
2017
2018	Pro Tools 2018+

=== The beginnings: Digidrums (1983–1985) ===
Pro Tools was developed by UC Berkeley graduates Evan Brooks, who majored in electrical engineering and computer science, and Peter Gotcher.

In 1983, the two friends, sharing an interest in music and electronic and software engineering, decided to study the memory mapping of the newly released E-mu Drumulator drum machine to create EPROM sound replacement chips. The Drumulator was quite popular at that time, although it was limited to its built-in samples.

They started selling the upgrade chips one year later under their new Digidrums label. Five different upgrade chips were available, offering different alternate drum styles. The chips, easily switchable with the original ones, enjoyed remarkable success among Drumulator users, selling 60,000 units overall.

=== Digidesign Sound Designer (1985–1989) ===
When Apple released its first Macintosh computer in 1984, the pair thought to design a more functional and flexible solution which could take advantage of a graphical interface. In collaboration with E-Mu, they developed a Mac-based visual sample editing system for the Emulator II keyboard, called Sound Designer, released under the Digidesign brand and inspired by the interface of the Fairlight CMI. This system, the first ancestor of Pro Tools, was released in 1985 at the price of US$995.

Brooks and Gotcher rapidly ported Sound Designer to many other sampling keyboards, such as E-mu Emax, Akai S900, Sequential Prophet 2000, Korg DSS-1, and Ensoniq Mirage. Thanks to the universal file specification subsequently developed by Brooks with version 1.5, Sound Designer files could be transferred via MIDI between sampling keyboards of different manufacturers. This universal file specification, along with the printed source code to a 68000 assembly language interrupt-driven MIDI driver, was distributed through Macintosh MIDI interface manufacturer Assimilation, which manufactured the first MIDI interface for the Mac in 1985.

Starting from the same year, a dial-up service provided by Beaverton Digital Systems, called MacMusic, allowed Sound Designer users to download and install the entire Emulator II sound library to other less expensive samplers: sample libraries could be shared across different manufacturers platforms without copyright infringement. MacMusic contributed to Sound Designer's success by leveraging both the universal file format and developing the first online sample file download site globally, many years before the World Wide Web use soared. The service used 2400-baud modems and 100 MB of disk space with Red Ryder host on a 1 MB Macintosh Plus.

With the release of Apple Macintosh II in 1987, which provided card slots, a hard disk, and more capable memory, Brooks and Gotcher saw the possibility to evolve Sound Designer into a featured digital audio workstation. They discussed with E-mu the opportunity of using the Emulator III as a platform for their updated software, but E-mu rejected this offer. Therefore, they decided to design both the software and the hardware autonomously. Motorola, which was working on its 56K series of digital signal processors, invited the two to participate in its development. Brooks designed a circuit board for the processor, then developed the software to make it work with Sound Designer. A beta version of the DSP was ready by December 1988.

=== Digidesign Sound Tools and Sound Designer II software (1989–1990) ===
The combination of the hardware and the software was called Sound Tools. Advertised as the "first tapeless studio", it was presented on January 20, 1989, at the NAMM International Music & Sound Expo. The system relied on a NuBus card called Sound Accelerator, equipped with one Motorola 56001 processor. The card provided 16-bit playback and 44.1/48 kHz recording through a two-channel A/D converter (AD In), while the DSP handled signal processing, which included a ten-band graphic equalizer, a parametric equalizer, time stretching with pitch preservation, fade-in/fade-out envelopes, and crossfades ("merging") between two sound files.

Sound Tools was bundled with Sound Designer II software, which was, at this time, a simple mono or stereo audio editor running on Mac SE or Mac II; digital audio acquisition from DAT was also possible. A two-channel digital interface (DAT-I/O) with AES/EBU and S/PDIF connections was made available later in 1989, while the Pro I/O interface came out in 1990 with 18-bit converters.

The file format used by Sound Designer II (SDII) became eventually a standard for digital audio file exchange until the WAV file format took over a decade later. Since audio streaming and non-destructive editing were performed on hard drives, the software was still limited by their performance; densely edited tracks could cause glitches. However, the rapidly evolving computer technology allowed developments towards a multi-track sequencer.

=== Deck, Pro Tools, Sound Tools II and Pro Tools II (1990–1994) ===
The core engine and much of the user interface of the first iteration of Pro Tools was based on Deck. The software, published in 1990, was the first multi-track digital recorder based on a personal computer. It was developed by OSC, a small San Francisco company founded the same year, in conjunction with Digidesign and ran on Digidesign's hardware. Deck could run four audio tracks with automation; MIDI sequencing was possible during playback and record, and one effect combination could be assigned to each audio track (2-band parametric equalizer, 1-band EQ with delay, 1-band EQ with chorus, delay with chorus).

The first Pro Tools system was launched on June 5, 1991. It was based on an adapted version of Deck (ProDeck) along with Digidesign's new editing software, ProEdit, created by Mark Jeffery; Sound Designer II was still supplied for two-channel editing. Pro Tools relied on Digidesign's Audiomedia card, mounting one Motorola 56001 processor with a clock rate of 22.58 MHz and offering two analog and two digital channels of I/O, and on the Sound Accelerator card. External synchronization with audio and video tape machines was possible with SMPTE timecode and the Video Slave drivers. The complete system was sold for US$6,000.

Audiomedia II and SampleCell II Soundcards

Sound Tools II was launched in 1992 with a new DSP card. Two interfaces were also released: Pro Master 20, providing 20-bit A/D conversion, and Audiomedia II, with improved digital converters and one Motorola 56001 processor running at 33.86 MHz.

In 1993, Josh Rosen, Mats Myrberg and John Dalton, the OSC's engineers who developed Deck, split from Digidesign to focus on releasing lower-cost multi-track software that would run on computers with no additional hardware. This software was known as Session (for stereo-only audio cards) and Session 8 (for multichannel audio interfaces) and was sold for US$399.

Peter Gotcher felt that the software needed a significant rewrite. Pro Tools II, the first software release fully developed by Digidesign, followed in the same year and addressed its predecessor's weaknesses. The editor and the mixer were merged into a single Pro Tools application that utilized the Digidesign Audio Engine (DAE) created by Peter Richert. DAE was also provided as a separate application to favor hardware support from third-party developers, enabling the use of Pro Tools hardware and plug-ins on other DAWs. Selling more than 8,000 systems worldwide, Pro Tools II became the best-selling digital audio workstation.

=== Pro Tools II TDM: 16 tracks and real-time plug-ins (1994) ===
In 1994, Pro Tools 2.5 implemented Digidesign's newly developed time-division multiplexing technology, which allowed routing of multiple digital audio streams between DSP cards. With TDM, up to four NuBus cards could be linked, obtaining a 16-track system, while multiple DSP-based plug-ins could be run simultaneously and in real-time. The wider bandwidth required to run the larger number of tracks was achieved with a SCSI expansion card developed by Grey Matter Response, called System Accelerator.

In the same year, Digidesign announced that it merged into the American multimedia company Avid, developer of the digital video editing platform Media Composer and one of Digidesign's major customers (25% of Sound Accelerator and Audiomedia cards produced was being bought by Avid). The operation was finalized in 1995.

=== Pro Tools III: 48 tracks, DSP Farm cards and switch to PCI cards (1995–1997) ===
With a redesigned Disk I/O card, Pro Tools III was able to provide 16 tracks with a single NuBus card; the system could be expanded using TDM to up to three Disk I/O cards, achieving 48 tracks. DSP Farm cards were introduced to increase the processing power needed for a more extensive real-time audio processing; each card was equipped with three Motorola 56001 chips running at 40 MHz. Multiple DSP cards could be added for additional processing power; each card could handle the playback of 16 tracks. A dedicated SCSI card was still required to provide the required bandwidth to support multiple-card systems.

Along with Pro Tools III, Digidesign launched the 888 interface, with eight channels of analog and digital I/O, and the cheaper 882 interface. The Session 8 system included a control surface with eight faders. A series of TDM plug-ins were bundled with the software, including dynamics processing, EQ, delay, modulation, and reverb.

In 1996, following Apple's decision to drop NuBus in favor of PCI bus, Digidesign added PCI support with Pro Tools 3.21. The PCI version of the Disk I/O card incorporated a high-speed SCSI along with DSP chips, while the upgraded DSP Farm PCI card included four Motorola 56002 chips running at 66 MHz.

This change of architecture allowed the convergence of Macintosh computers with Intel-based PCs, for which PCI had become the standard internal communication bus. With the PCI version of Digidesign's Audiomedia card in 1997 (Audiomedia III), Sound Tools and Pro Tools could be run on Windows platforms for the first time.

=== 24-bit audio and surround mixing: Pro Tools | 24 and Pro Tools | 24 MIX (1997–2002) ===
With the release of Pro Tools | 24 in 1997, Digidesign introduced a new 24-bit interface (the 888|24) and a new PCI card (the d24). The d24 relied on Motorola 56301 processors, offering increased processing power and 24 tracks of 24-bit audio (later increased to 32 tracks with a DAE software update). A SCSI accelerator was required to keep up with the increased data throughput. Digidesign dropped its proprietary SCSI controller in favor of commercially available ones.

64 tracks with dual d24 support were introduced with Pro Tools 4.1.1 in 1998, while the updated Pro Tools | 24 MIX system provided three times more DSP power with the MIX Core DSP cards. MIXplus systems combined a MIX Core with a MIX Farm, obtaining a performance increase of 700% compared to a Pro Tools | 24 system.

Pro Tools 5 saw two substantial software developments: extended MIDI functionality and integration in 1999 (an editable piano-roll view in the editor; MIDI automation, quantize and transpose) and the introduction of surround sound mixing and multichannel plug-ins—up to the 7.1 format—with Pro Tools TDM 5.1 in 2001.

The migration from traditional, tape-based analog studio technology to the Pro Tools platform took place within the industry: Ricky Martin's "Livin' la Vida Loca" (1999) was the first Billboard Hot 100 number-one single to be recorded, edited, and mixed entirely within the Pro Tools environment, allowing a more meticulous and effortless editing workflow (especially on vocals).

While consolidating its presence in professional studios, Digidesign began to target the mid-range consumer market in 1999 by introducing the Digi001 bundle, consisting of a rack-mount audio interface with eight inputs and outputs with 24-bit, 44.1/48 kHz capability and MIDI connections. The package was distributed with Pro Tools LE, a specific version of the software without DSP support, limited to 24 mixing tracks.

=== High-resolution audio and consolidation of digital recording and mixing: Pro Tools | HD (2002–2011) ===
Following the launch of Mac OS X operating system in 2001, Digidesign made a substantial redesign of Pro Tools hardware and software. Pro Tools | HD was launched in 2002, replacing the Pro Tools | 24 system and relying on a new range of DSP cards (HD Core and HD Process, replacing MIX Core and MIX Farm), new interfaces running at up to 192 kHz or 96 kHz sample rates (HD 192 and 96, replacing 888 and 882), along with an updated version of the software (Pro Tools 6) with new features and a redesigned GUI, developed for OS X and Windows XP. Two HD interfaces could be linked together for increased I/O through a proprietary connection. The base system was selling for US$12,000, while the full system was selling for US$20,000.

Both HD Core and Process cards mounted nine Motorola 56361 chips running at 100 MHz, each providing 25% more processing power than the Motorola 56301 chips mounted on MIX cards; this translated to about twice the power for a single card. A system could combine one HD Core card with up to two HD Process cards, supporting playback for 96/48/12 tracks at 48/96/192 kHz sample rates (with a single HD Core card installed) and 128/64/24 tracks at 48/96/192 kHz sample rates (with one or two HD Process cards).

When Apple changed the expansion slot architecture of the Mac G5 to PCI Express, Digidesign launched a line of PCIe DSP cards that both adopted the new card slot format and slightly changed the combination of chips. HD Process cards were replaced with HD Accel, each mounting nine Motorola 56321 chips running at 200 MHz and each providing twice the power than an HD Process card; track count for systems mounting an HD Accel was extended to 192/96/36 tracks at 48/96/192 kHz sample rates. The use of PCI Express connection reduced round-trip delay time, while DSP audio processing allowed the use of smaller hardware buffer sizes during recording, assuring stable performance with extremely low latency.

Pro Tools, offering a solid and reliable alternative to analog recording and mixing, eventually became a standard in professional studios throughout the decade, while editing features such as Beat Detective (introduced with Pro Tools 5.1 in 2001) and Elastic Audio (introduced with Pro Tools 7.4 in 2007) redefined the workflow adopted in contemporary music production.

Other software milestones were background tasks processing (such as fade rendering, file conversion or relinking), real-time insertion of TDM plug-ins during playback, and a browser/database environment introduced with Pro Tools 6 in 2003; Automatic plug-in Delay Compensation (ADC), introduced with Pro Tools 6.4 in 2004 and only available with TDM systems with HD Accel; a new implementation of RTAS with multi-threading support and improved performance, Region groups, Instrument tracks, and real-time MIDI processing, introduced with Pro Tools 7 in 2006; VCA and volume trim, introduced with Pro Tools 7.2 in 2006; support for ten track inserts, MIDI Editor, and MIDI Score, introduced with Pro Tools 8 in 2009.

Pro Tools | MIX hardware support was dropped with version 6.4.1.

==== Native systems: Pro Tools LE and Pro Tools M-Powered ====
Pro Tools LE, first introduced and distributed in 1999 with the Digi 001 interface, was a specific Pro Tools version in which the signal processing entirely relied on the host CPU. The software required a Digidesign interface to run, which acted as a copy-protection mechanism for the software. Mbox was the entry-level range of the available interface; Digi 001 and Digi 002/003, which also provided a control surface, were the upper range. The Eleven Rack also ran on Pro Tools LE, included in-box DSP processing via an FPGA chip, offloading guitar amp/speaker emulation, and guitar effects plug-in processing to the interface, allowing them to run without taxing the host system.

Pro Tools LE shared the same interface of Pro Tools HD but had a smaller track count (24 tracks with Pro Tools 5, extended to 32 tracks with Pro Tools 6 and 48 tracks with Pro Tools 8) and supported a maximum sample rate of 96 kHz (depending on the interface used). Some advanced software features, such as Automatic Delay Compensation, surround mixing, multi-track Beat Detective, OMF/AAF support, and SMPTE Timecode, were omitted. Some of them, as well as support for 48 tracks/96 voices (extended to 64 tracks/128 voices with Pro Tools 8) and additional plug-ins, were made available through an expansion package called "Music Production Toolkit". The "Complete Production Toolkit", introduced with Pro Tools 8, added support for surround mixing and 128 tracks (while the system was still limited to 128 voices).

With the acquisition of M-Audio in 2004–2005, Digidesign released a specific variant of Pro Tools, called M-Powered, which was equivalent to Pro Tools LE and could be run with M-Audio interfaces.

The Pro Tools LE/M-Powered line was discontinued with the release of Pro Tools 9.

==== Hardware-independent native systems: Pro Tools 9 ====
Pro Tools 9, released in November 2010, dropped the requirement of proprietary hardware to run the software. Any audio device could be used through Core Audio on macOS or the ASIO driver on a Windows. Core Audio allowed device aggregation, enabling using of more than one interface simultaneously. Some Pro Tools HD software features, such as automatic plug-in delay compensation, OMF/AAF file import, Timecode ruler, and multi-track Beat Detective, were included in the standard version of Pro Tools 9.

When operating on a machine containing one or more HD Core, Accel, or Native cards, the software ran as Pro Tools HD with the complete HD feature set. In all other cases, it ran as Pro Tools 9 standard, with a smaller track count and some advanced features turned off.

==== Advanced Instrument Research (AIR): built-in virtual instruments and plug-ins ====
In response to Apple's decision to include Emagic's complete line of virtual instruments in Logic Pro in 2004 and following Avid's acquisition of German virtual instruments developer Wizoo in 2005, Pro Tools 8 was supplied with its first built-in virtual instruments library, the AIR Creative Collection, as well as with some new plug-ins, to make it more appealing for music production. An expansion was also available, called AIR Complete Collection.

List of AIR Virtual Instruments

AIR Creative Collection
Structure Free	sampler with basic library
Boom	electronic drum machine
Vacuum	virtual subtractive-style synthesizer
Mini Grand	sampled acoustic piano
DB33	sampled Hammond B3 organ
Xpand!2	synthesis and sample-based library

AIR Complete Collection
Structure	sampler with full library
Strike	virtual drummer
Hybrid	virtual subtractive synthesizer
Velvet	sampled classic electric pianos
Transfuser	real-time loop manipulation tool

=== Pro Tools | HDX (2011–present) ===
In October 2011, Avid introduced Pro Tools 10 and a new series of DSP PCIe cards named HDX. Each card mounted 18 DSP processors, manufactured by Texas Instruments, allowing an increased computational precision (32-bit floating-point resolution for audio processing and 64-bit floating-point summing, versus the previous 24-bit and 48-bit fixed-point resolution of the TDM engine), thus improving dynamic range performance. Signal processing could be run on the embedded DSP, providing additional computational power and enabling near zero-latency for DSP-reliant plug-ins. Two FPGA chips handled track playback, monitoring, and internal routing, providing a lower round trip latency.

A second line of PCIe cards, called HD Native, provided low latency with a single FPGA chip but did not mount DSP (audio processing relied on the host system's CPU). Round trip latency at 96 kHz was 0.7 ms for HDX and 1.7 ms for HD Native (with a 64-sample buffer).

To maintain performance consistency, HDX products were specified with a fixed maximum number of voices (each voice representing a monophonic channel). Each HDX card enabled 256 simultaneous voices at 44.1/48 kHz; voice count halved when the sample rate doubled (128 voices at 88.2/96 kHz, 64 voices at 176.4/192 kHz). Up to three HDX cards could be installed on a single system for a maximum of 768/384/192 total voices and for increased processing power. On Native systems, voice count was limited to 96/48/24 voices with the standard version of Pro Tools and 256/128/64 voices with Pro Tools HD software.

With Pro Tools 10, Avid deployed a new plug-in format for both Native and HDX systems called AAX (an acronym for Avid Audio eXtension). AAX Native replaced RTAS plug-ins and AAX DSP, a specific format running on HDX systems, replaced TDM plug-ins. AAX was developed to provide the future implementation of 64-bit plug-ins, although 32-bit versions of AAX were still used in Pro Tools 10. TDM support was dropped with HDX, while Pro Tools 10 would be the final release for Pro Tools | HD Process and Accel systems.

Notable software features introduced with Pro Tools 10 were editable clip-based gain automation (Clip gain), the ability to load the session's audio data into RAM to improve transport responsiveness (Disk caching), quadrupled Automatic Delay Compensation length, audio fades processed in real-time, timeline length extended to 24 hours, support for 32-bit float audio and mixed audio formats within the session, and the addition of Avid Channel Strip plug-in (based on Euphonix System 5 console's channel strip, following Avid's acquisition of Euphonix in 2010).

=== Switch to 64-bit architecture (2013) ===
Pro Tools 11, released in June 2013, switched from 32-bit to 64-bit software architecture with new audio and video engines, enabling the application and plug-ins to fully take advantage of system memory. The new audio engine (AAE) introduced support of offline bouncing and simultaneous mixdowns multiple sources; dynamic plug-in processing allowed to reduce CPU usage when active native plug-ins do not receive any input. Two separate buffers were used for playback and for monitoring of record-enabled or input-monitored tracks. The new video engine (AVE) improved performance and handling of multiple CPU cores.

Support for HD Accel systems, legacy HD interfaces, TDM and 32-bit AAX plug-ins was dropped due to their incompatibility with 64-bit architecture. A free starter edition providing the essential features of Pro Tools, called "First", was launched in 2015 and discontinued in December 2021 for being "unviable to continue on a technical level".

== Features ==
The timeline of Pro Tools 9 showing audio and MIDI tracks, running on Windows

Pro Tools workflow is organized into two main windows: the timeline is shown in the Edit window, while the mixer is shown in the Mix window. MIDI and Score Editor windows provide a dedicated environment to edit MIDI. Different window layouts, along with shown and hidden tracks and their width settings, can be stored and recalled from the Window configuration list.

=== Timeline ===
The timeline provides a graphical representation of all types of tracks: the audio envelope or waveform (when zoomed in) for audio tracks, a piano roll showing MIDI notes and controller values for MIDI and Instrument tracks, a sequence of frame thumbnails for video tracks, audio levels for auxiliary, master and VCA master tracks. Alternate audio and MIDI content can be recorded, shown, and edited in multiple layers for each track (called playlists), which can be used for track compositing. All the mixer parameters (such as track and sends volume, pan, and mute status) and plug-in parameters can be changed over time through automation. Any automation type can be shown and edited in multiple lanes for each track. Track-based volume automation can be converted to clip-based automation and vice versa; automation of any type can also be copied and pasted to any other automation type.

Time can be measured and displayed on the timeline in different scales: bars and beats, time or SMPTE timecode (with selectable frame rates), audio samples, or film stock feet for audio-for-film referencing (based on the 35 mm film format). Tempo and meter changes can also be programmed; both MIDI and audio clips can move or time-stretch to follow tempo changes ("tick-based" tracks) or maintain their absolute position ("sample-based" tracks). Elastic Audio must be enabled to allow time stretching of audio clips.

=== Editing ===
Audio and MIDI clips can be moved, cut, and duplicated non-destructively on the timeline (edits change the clip organization on the timeline, but source files are not overwritten). Time stretching (TCE), pitch shifting, equalization, and dynamics processing can be applied to audio clips non-destructively and in real-time with Elastic Audio and Clip Effects; gain can be adjusted statically or dynamically on individual clips with Clip Gain; fade and crossfades can be applied, adjusted and are processed in real-time. All other types of audio processing can be rendered on the timeline with the AudioSuite (non-real-time) version of AAX plug-ins. Audio clips can be converted to MIDI data using the Celemony Melodyne engine; pitches with timing and velocities are extracted through melodic, polyphonic, or rhythmic analysis algorithms. Pitch and rhythm of audio tracks can also be viewed and manipulated with the bundled Melodyne Essential.

MIDI notes, velocities, and controllers can be edited directly on the timeline, each MIDI track showing an individual piano roll, or in a specific window, where several MIDI and Instrument tracks can be shown together in a single piano roll with color-coding. Multiple MIDI controllers for each track can be viewed and edited on different lanes. MIDI tracks can also be shown in musical notation within a score editor. MIDI data such as note quantization, duration, transposition, delay, and velocity can also be altered non-destructively and in real-time on a track-per-track basis.

Video files can be imported to one or more video tracks and organized in multiple playlists. Multiple video files can be edited together and played back in real-time. Video processing is GPU-accelerated and managed by the Avid Video Engine (AVE). Video output from one video track is provided in a separate window or can be viewed full screen.

=== Mixing ===
The virtual mixer shows controls and components of all tracks, including inserts, sends, input and output assignments, automation read/write controls, panning, solo/mute buttons, arm record buttons, the volume fader, the level meter, and the track name. It also can show additional controls for the inserted virtual instrument, mic preamp gain, HEAT settings, and the EQ curve of supported plug-ins. Each track inputs and outputs can have different channel depths: mono, stereo, multichannel (LCR, LCRS, Quad, 5.0/5.1, 6.0/6.1, 7.0/7.1); Dolby Atmos and Ambisonics formats are also available for mixing.

Audio can be routed to and from different outputs and inputs, both physical and internal. Internal routing is achieved using busses and auxiliary tracks; each track can have multiple output assignments. Virtual instruments are loaded on Instrument tracks—a specific type of track that receives MIDI data in input and returns audio in output.

Plug-ins are processed in real-time with dedicated DSP chips (AAX DSP format) or using the host computer's CPU (AAX Native format).

==== Track rendering ====
Audio, auxiliary, and Instrument tracks (or MIDI tracks routed to a virtual instrument plug-in) can be committed to new tracks containing their rendered output. Virtual instruments can be committed to audio to prepare an arrangement project for mixing; track commit is also used to free up system resources during mixing or when the session is shared with systems not having some plug-ins installed. Multiple tracks can be rendered at a time; it is also possible to render a specific timeline selection and define which range of inserts to render.

Similarly, tracks can be frozen with their output rendered at the end of the plug-in chain or at a specific insert of their chain. Editing is suspended on frozen tracks, but they can subsequently be unfrozen if further adjustments are needed. For example, virtual instruments can be frozen to free up system memory and improve performance while keeping the possibility to unfreeze them to make arrangement changes.

==== Mixdown ====
The main mix of the session—or any internal mix bus or output path—can be bounced to disk in real-time (if hardware inserts from analog hardware are used, or if any audio or MIDI source is monitored live into the session) or offline (faster-than-real-time). The selected source can be mixed to mono, stereo, or any other multichannel format. Multichannel mixdowns can be written as an interleaved audio file or in multiple mono files. Up to 24 sources of up to 10 channels each can be mixed down simultaneously—for example, to deliver audio stems.

Audio and video can be bounced together to a MOV file; video is transcoded with the DNxHD, DNxHR, Apple ProRes, and H.264 video codecs.

=== Session data exchange ===
Session data can be partially or entirely exchanged with other DAWs or video editing software that support AAF, OMF, or MXF. AAF and OMF sequences embed audio and video files with their metadata; when opened by the destination application, session structure is rebuilt with the original clip placement, edits, and basic track and clip automation.

Track contents and any of its properties can be selectively exchanged between Pro Tools sessions with Import Session Data (for example, importing audio clips from an external session to a designated track while keeping track settings or importing track inserts while keeping audio clips). Similarly, the same track data for any track set—a given processing chain, a collection of clips, or a group of tracks with their assignments—can be stored and recalled as Track Presets.

=== Cloud collaboration ===
Pro Tools projects can be synchronized to the Avid Cloud and shared with other users on a track-by-track basis. Different users can simultaneously work on the project and upload new tracks or any changes to existing tracks (such as audio and MIDI clips, automation, inserted plug-ins, and mixer status) or alterations to the project structure (such as tempo, meter, or key).

=== Field recorder workflows ===
Pro Tools reads embedded metadata in media files to manage multichannel recordings made by field recorders in production sound. All stored metadata (such as scene and take numbers, tape or sound roll name, or production comments) can be accessed in the Workspace browser.

Analogous audio clips are identified by overlapping longitudinal timecode (LTC) and by one or more user-defined criteria (such as matching file length, file name, or scene and take numbers). An audio segment can be replaced from matching channels (for example, to replace audio from a boom microphone with the audio from a lavalier microphone) while maintaining edits and fades in the timeline, or any matching channels can be added to new tracks.

=== Multi-system linking and device synchronization ===
Up to twelve Pro Tools Ultimate systems with dedicated hardware can be linked together over an Ethernet network—for example, in multi-user mixing environments where different mix components (such as dialog, ADR, effects, and music) reside on different systems, or if a larger track count or processing power is needed. Transport, solo, and mute are controlled by a single system and with a single control surface. One system can also be designated for video playback to optimize performance. Pro Tools can synchronize to external devices using SMPTE/EBU timecode or MIDI timecode.

== Editions ==
Pro Tools software is available in three subscription-based paid versions (Artist, Studio and Ultimate) and one free version (Intro).

Before 2022, two different perpetual licenses could be purchased: a standard edition for US$599 (informally called "Vanilla"), which provided all the key features for audio mixing and post-production, and a complete edition for US$2599 (officially called "Ultimate" and known as "HD" between 2002 and 2018), which unlocked functionality for advanced workflows and a higher track count.

Pro Tools feature comparison
Subscription/Software	Pro Tools Intro	Pro Tools Artist	Pro Tools Studio	Pro Tools Flex/Ultimate
License type	Free	Paid (subscription)		
Subscription price	–	US$9.00/month	US$31.99/month	US$99.99/month
Perpetual + Support Plan renewal price	–	US$199 (base), US$69 (renewal)	US$599 (base), US$199 (renewal)	US$1499 (base), US$599 (renewal)
Maximum voices, tracks, and hardware inputs
Audio tracks	8 (mono/stereo)	32 (mono/stereo)	512 (mono/stereo/surround)	2048 (mono/stereo/surround)
Voices	n/a			2048 (native/HDX Hybrid)
Voices	n/a			256/card (HDX classic)
Simultaneous recording inputs	4	16	64	256/192/64 (Native/HDX/HD Native)
MIDI tracks	8	64	1024	
Instrument tracks	8	32	512	
Auxiliary tracks/Routing folders	4	32	128	1024
VCA tracks	n/a		128	
Video tracks	n/a		1	64
Aux I/O	No	Yes	Yes	Yes
Bit depth, Sample rate	32-bit float, 192 kHz			
Production tools
Editing tools	Basic	Standard		Advanced
Included plugins	Intro bundle (36)	3rd Party ARA 2 Plugins		
Included plugins	Intro bundle (36)	Artist bundle (100)	Complete Plugin Bundle	
MIDI editor/keyboard, Elastic Audio Elastic Pitch, Track presets, ARA 2	Yes	Yes	Yes	Yes
Score editor, Beat Detective, Input monitoring, Clip gain	No	Yes	Yes	Yes
Audio to MIDI conversion	No	Yes	Yes	Yes
Batch Track/Clip rename, Space clips	No	No	Yes	Yes
AVE, Video editing tools, Field recorder workflows	No	No	Yes	Yes (Advanced video editing)
Mixing tools
Multichannel mixing	Stereo		Up to 7.1.4 surroundDolby Atmos/Ambisonics (up to 3rd order)	Up to 9.1.6 surround Dolby Atmos/Ambisonics (up to 7th order)
Automation	Standard		Advanced	
Clip effects	Playback only		Full	
Plug-in delay compensation, Offline bounce, Track freeze	Yes	Yes	Yes	Yes
VCA, AFL/PFL solo path, Advanced metering	No	No	Yes	Yes
Dolby Atmos, Ambisonics VR, surround mixing, ADM export	No	No	Yes	Yes
HEAT	No	Yes	Yes	Yes
Program features
Cloud collaboration	On invite	Yes (includes 1 GB of free storage space)		
Session data importing	No	Yes	Yes	Yes
Timecode ruler, AAC codec	No	Yes	Yes	Yes
AAF / OMF / MXF file support	No	No	Yes	Yes
Disk cache	No	No	Yes	Yes
Satellite Link	No	No	Yes (Only as Video Satellite)	Yes (up to 12 systems with HD hardware, or 2 systems without)
VENUE Link	No	No	Yes	Yes

== Control surfaces ==
In the mid-1990s, Digidesign started working on a studio device that could replace classic analog consoles and provide integration with Pro Tools. ProControl (1998) was the first Digidesign control surface, providing motorized, touch-sensitive faders, an analog control room communication section, and connecting to the host computer via Ethernet. ProControl could be later expanded by adding up to five fader packs, each providing eight additional fader strips and controls.

Control 24 (2001) added 5.1 monitoring support and included 16 class A preamps designed by Focusrite. Icon D-Control (2004) incorporated an HD Accel system and was developed for larger TV and film productions in mind. Command|8 (2004) and D-Command (2005) were the smaller counterparts of Control 24 and D-Control, connected with the host computer via USB; Venue (2005) was a similar system specifically designed for live sound applications.

C|24 (2007) was a revision of Control 24 with improved preamps, while Icon D-Control ES (2008) and Icon D-Command ES (2009) were redesigns of Icon D-Control and D-Command.

In 2010 Avid acquired Euphonix, manufacturer of the Artist Series, and System 5 control surfaces. They were integrated with Pro Tools along with the EuCon protocols. Avid S6 (2013) and Avid S3 (2014) control surfaces followed by merging the Icon and System 5 series. Pro Tools Dock (2015) was an iPad-based control surface running Pro Tools | Control (now Avid Control) software. The Avid S1 (2019) control surface replaced the Artist Series and underwent a redesign to bring the design closer to the S6 and accommodate a tablet running Avid Control. Avid S4 (2019) is a smaller, less modular version of the S6 designed for smaller-budget music and post houses.

== Timeline of Pro Tools hardware and software ==
Year	Software	Hardware	Release information
1985	Sound Designer		Macintosh-based visual sample editing software developed for the E-Mu Emulator II sampler dedicated ports of the original software were subsequently released for Emax, Prophet 2000, S900, DSS-1, and Mirage samplers
1987	Sound Designer 1.5	Sound Accelerator	universal version with enhanced editing features through Mac's hardware (mix, crossfade, gain and equalization) and supporting a variety of samplers compatible with Sound Accelerator NuBus card, equipped with one Motorola 56001 chip, providing dedicated DSP hardware
1989	Sound Tools		stereo hard-disk recording and editing system with 16-bit audio, 44.1 kHz or 48 kHz sample rate adopting the SDII proprietary audio format relies on a Sound Accelerator NuBus card connected to an external 2-channel AD converter and Sound Designer II software running on Macintosh SE and Mac II
1989	Sound Designer II	Sound Accelerator; Audiomedia I	stereo hard-disk recording and editing system with 16-bit audio, 44.1 kHz or 48 kHz sample rate adopting the SDII proprietary audio format relies on a Sound Accelerator NuBus card connected to an external 2-channel AD converter and Sound Designer II software running on Macintosh SE and Mac II
1991	Pro Tools		Mac-based 4-track digital production system handled by ProEdit (editing software) and ProDeck (mixing software); MIDI sequencing and automation
1991	ProEdit; ProDeck		Mac-based 4-track digital production system handled by ProEdit (editing software) and ProDeck (mixing software); MIDI sequencing and automation
1992	Pro Tools 1.1		4–16 voices support in mixing using up to four cards/interfaces
1992	Sound Tools II		support for Pro Master 20 interface with 20-bit A/D conversion
1993	Pro Tools II		editing and mixing software merged in a single application called Pro Tools with the component DAE (Digidesign Audio Engine); 4 voices support
1993		Audiomedia II	editing and mixing software merged in a single application called Pro Tools with the component DAE (Digidesign Audio Engine); 4 voices support
1994	Pro Tools II TDM (2.5)		TDM technology enables real-time effects to run as software plug-ins; up to 4 NuBus cards can be linked together
1994	Pro Tools III		16–48 voices on NuBus-based Mac systems (up to three cards linkable); DSP Farm NuBus card equipped with 3 Motorola 56001 chips (40 MHz clock speed) for additional processing power software editing functionality improved
1994		DSP Farm	16–48 voices on NuBus-based Mac systems (up to three cards linkable); DSP Farm NuBus card equipped with 3 Motorola 56001 chips (40 MHz clock speed) for additional processing power software editing functionality improved
1996	Pro Tools III PCI		16–48 voices for PCI-based Mac systems (up to 3 cards linkable); 88x series interfaces with 8 channels I/O, 16-bit AD/DA converters, AES/EBU I/O; DSP Farm PCI card equipped with 4 Motorola 56002 chips (66 MHz clock speed)
1996	Pro Tools 3.21	888 I/O, 882 I/O; DSP Farm	16–48 voices for PCI-based Mac systems (up to 3 cards linkable); 88x series interfaces with 8 channels I/O, 16-bit AD/DA converters, AES/EBU I/O; DSP Farm PCI card equipped with 4 Motorola 56002 chips (66 MHz clock speed)
1997	Pro Tools 4	Pro Tools Project Card	WAV and QuickTime file support; Sound Designer file editing features integrated into AudioSuite toolset runs on Pro Tools III NuBus/PCI systems or without TDM hardware with limitations (Project or PowerMix versions) destructive editing integrated, fade improvements, Strip Silence, continuous playback during editing, independently resizable tracks, up to 26 track groups, automation extended to all mixer and plug-in parameters, new automation modes Loop Record, Half-Speed Record, Destructive Record, QuickPunch (punch-in and out recording during playback); Edit window configurations can be saved and recalled with Memory Locations
1997	Pro Tools | 24		24–48 or 32–64 channels of 24-bit audio I/O support via the d24 PCI card 88x interface line upgraded with 24-bit AD converters, 20-bit DA converters (888|24), 20-bit AD/DA converters (882|20)
1997	Pro Tools 4.1	d24 888|24, 882|20	24–48 or 32–64 channels of 24-bit audio I/O support via the d24 PCI card 88x interface line upgraded with 24-bit AD converters, 20-bit DA converters (888|24), 20-bit AD/DA converters (882|20)
1998	Pro Tools | 24 MIX		16–48 I/O channels, 64 voices MIX, MIXplus and MIX3 system configurations with one MIX Card and up to two MIX Farm PCI cards equipped with 6 Motorola Onyx chips
1998	Pro Tools 4.3	MIX Card; MIX Farm	16–48 I/O channels, 64 voices MIX, MIXplus and MIX3 system configurations with one MIX Card and up to two MIX Farm PCI cards equipped with 6 Motorola Onyx chips
1998		ADAT Bridge I/O	20-bit digital interface with 16 ADAT optical input channels
1998		ProControl	first dedicated control surface for Pro Tools using Ethernet connection with microphone and line inputs
1999	Pro Tools 5		integrated MIDI and audio editing/mixing, MIDI piano-roll display, graphic MIDI velocity editing, MIDI quantize single-stroke key commands for editing, Region Replace, floating video window
2000	Pro Tools LE	Digi 001 (LE)	mid-level recording system with 24 tracks, 8 analog I/O channels, 2 microphone preamps, 24-bit AD/DA, digital I/O and MIDI rack-mountable interface connected with a PCI card running a new feature-limited software line ("Light Edition") with RTAS host-based processing (without DSP)
2000		Control|24	touch-sensitive control surface equipped with 24 Focusrite preamps
2001	Pro Tools Free		free version with essential features, based on version 5, runs natively on OS 9, OS 8.6, Windows 98, Windows ME; 8 audio tracks, 48 MIDI tracks, RTAS support
2001	Pro Tools 5.1		surround mixing, Beat Detective (TDM)
2002	Pro Tools | HD		HD software and hardware line adds support for 192 kHz and 96 kHz sample rates, runs with 192 I/O and 96 I/O interfaces providing 32–96 I/O channels HD1–HD3 systems are based on one HD Core adding up to two HD Process PCI-based cards equipped with 9 Motorola 56361 DSP chips (100 MHz clock speed); 96/48/12 tracks at 48/96/192 kHz sample rates with HD1 systems 128/64/24 tracks at 48/96/192 kHz sample rates with HD2/HD3 systems
2002	Pro Tools 5.3.1	192 I/O, 96 I/O; SYNC, MIDI, PRE	HD software and hardware line adds support for 192 kHz and 96 kHz sample rates, runs with 192 I/O and 96 I/O interfaces providing 32–96 I/O channels HD1–HD3 systems are based on one HD Core adding up to two HD Process PCI-based cards equipped with 9 Motorola 56361 DSP chips (100 MHz clock speed); 96/48/12 tracks at 48/96/192 kHz sample rates with HD1 systems 128/64/24 tracks at 48/96/192 kHz sample rates with HD2/HD3 systems
2002	Pro Tools 5.3.1	HD Core; HD Process	HD software and hardware line adds support for 192 kHz and 96 kHz sample rates, runs with 192 I/O and 96 I/O interfaces providing 32–96 I/O channels HD1–HD3 systems are based on one HD Core adding up to two HD Process PCI-based cards equipped with 9 Motorola 56361 DSP chips (100 MHz clock speed); 96/48/12 tracks at 48/96/192 kHz sample rates with HD1 systems 128/64/24 tracks at 48/96/192 kHz sample rates with HD2/HD3 systems
2002		Mbox (LE)	low-cost USB-powered audio interface with 2 analog inputs, 1 mic preamp, S/PDIF digital I/O, bundled with Pro Tools LE software
2002		Digi 002 (LE)	mid-level FireWire audio interface with 8 analog inputs, 24-bit/96 kHz converters, touch-sensitive control surface, running Pro Tools LE 5.3.2 on Windows XP and Mac OS 9
2003	Pro Tools 6		support for Mac OS X platform (OS 9 dropped), GUI redesign, real-time plug-in insertion for TDM systems Relative Grid mode, support for timeline vertical selection Digibase (workspace browser and database environment) for media/project management 256 MIDI tracks, Groove Template, additional MIDI commands, Import Session Data replaces Import Tracks new DigiRack plug-ins, more powerful LE version
2003	Pro Tools 6.1		support for Windows XP and ReWire, support for AAF
2003		Digi 002 Rack (LE)	mid-level FireWire audio interface with up to 18 I/O channels, 4 mic preamps, 24-bit/96 kHz AD/DA, support for 32 tracks with Pro Tools LE software
2003		HD Accel (HD)	DSP cards expansion equipped with 9 Motorola 56321 chips (200 MHz clock speed) twice the power as the HD Process cards extends track count to 192/96/36 tracks at 48/96/192 kHz sample rates (combined with one HD core card)
2004	Pro Tools 6.4		+12 dB fader range support for Command 8 control surface, Automatic Delay Compensation, TrackPunch, input monitoring on single tracks (HD)
2004	Pro Tools 6.9		160 auxiliary tracks, 128 busses, Surround Panner support, selectable PFL/AFL solo paths (HD) selectable solo mode (Latch or X-OR), new keyboard shortcuts, I/O setup improvements
2004		ICON D-Control; ICON D-Command	modular control surface line with 16–32 (D-Control) or 8–24 (D-Command) touch-sensitive faders and HD3 Accel DSP system
2005	Pro Tools M-Powered		standalone feature-limited product line bundled with M-Audio interfaces, same as Pro Tools LE
2005	Pro Tools 7	HD Accel PCIe (HD)	multi-threading RTAS engine improves performance on multi-core systems, support for 10 sends per track, Instrument tracks, Region Groups, region looping, real-time MIDI processing, new session format with Mac/PC interoperability; 160 I/O at 96 kHz (HD)
2005		VENUE Digi D-Show	new line of modular digital mixing consoles with DSP and integrated playback and recording with Pro Tools
2005		Mbox 2 (LE)	second generation of the Mbox USB audio interface
2006	Pro Tools 7.11		support for Intel-based Macs, Hybrid and Xpand! software sampler plug-ins added
2006	Pro Tools 7.2		digital VCA groups, enhanced automation, enhanced track grouping system, extended support for contextual menus, Dubber and Field Recorder enhancements; support for multiple Video tracks (HD)
2006	Pro Tools 7.3	Digi VENUE Profile	Dynamic Transport, Windows Configurations, Key Signature timeline ruler, MIDI selection enhancements, fade editing enhancements, continuously-resizable tracks, mixer configurations changes possible without stopping playback, mouse scroll wheel and right-click enhancements, Memory Location and Digibase enhancements, Signal Tools and Time Shift plug-ins added, MIDI data can be exchanged with Sibelius scoring software
2006		Mbox 2 Pro (LE); Mbox 2 Mini (LE)	new formats/variants of Mbox 2
2007	Pro Tools 7.4		Elastic Audio, Digibase browser enhancements
2007		Digi 003 (LE); Digi 003 Rack (LE)	
2007		Mbox 2 Micro (LE)	portable USB interface with mini-jack stereo output and bundled with Pro Tools LE; support limited to 44.1/48 kHz sample rates
2008	Pro Tools 8		revamped user interface, support for 10 inserts per track, Playlist view, and enhanced track compositing tools, support for multiple automation lanes view, Elastic Pitch, MIDI Editor, Score Editor, AIR Creative Collection; Automatic Delay Compensation on sends (HD)
2008		Digi 003 Rack + (LE)	
2009		Eleven Rack	guitar effects processor with Pro Tools LE DSP
2009		Mbox (LE); Mbox Pro (LE); Mbox Mini (LE) Digi VENUE SC48	third generation, first full release by Avid
2010	Pro Tools 8.1		HEAT software add-on (HD)
2010	Pro Tools 9		"standard" version replaces LE and M-Powered lines, gets most of the HD-only software features, and can be run on native systems with ASIO or Core Audio driver protocols full HD features can be purchased with Complete Production Toolkit 2 added 7.0/7.1 surround support (HD)EUCON (Extended User Control) Protocol Support
2010		HD I/O, HD OMNI, HD MADI, SYNC HD	HD Series Interfaces introduced (replaces the previous "blue" HD series)
2010		HD Native	PCI card or Thunderbolt interface, enables to run HD software on up to two HD (or HD-compatible) interfaces with low-latency performance and without DSP
2011	Pro Tools | HDX		96 voices, 512 Instrument tracks, 128 aux inputs, 1 video track, 128/64/32 tracks at 48/96/192 kHz sample rates (standard version); 256–768 voices, 512 Instrument tracks, 512 aux inputs, 64 video tracks, 256–768 tracks at 48 kHz sample rates, 64–192 I/O channels (HDX systems with 1–3 HDX cards); HDX replaces HD Core systems and HD1–HD3 configurations; each PCI card is equipped with 18 Texas Instruments DSP chips (350 MHz clock speed), can run AAX DSP plug-ins AAX (Avid Audio eXtension) plug-in format introduced with 64-bit ready SDK (32-bit still used); AAX DSP plug-ins replace TDM plug-ins in HD systems, RTAS still supported improved recording playback performance (disk cache, NAS support, disk scheduler improvements); Clip Gain, disk cache, real-time fades, 4x maximum Automatic Delay Compensation, 24-hour timeline, support for mixed file formats and 32-bit float resolution, interface improvements, Avid Channel Strip plug-in
2011	Pro Tools 10	HDX, Artist Mix, Artist Control, Artist Color, Artist Transport	
2013	Pro Tools 11	Avid S6, Avid VENUE S3L-X, Avid VENUE SC48 Remote	application upgraded with 64-bit architecture. 32-bit RTAS and TDM plug-in support dropped in favor of 64-bit AAX format; support discontinuation for HD Accel systems Offline bouncing, Dynamic Plug-In processing optimizes session performance; up to 16 sources can be bounced simultaneously, advanced metering options (HD)
2014		Duet; Quartet, Avid S3 (Control Surface)	2-channel and 4-channel USB interfaces/monitor controllers with 192 kHz AD/DA conversion developed by Apogee
2015	Pro Tools | First		free software line with essential features, cloud-based sessions up to 96 kHz sample rate, 16 tracks per type (audio, MIDI, Instrument, and auxiliary), 4 I/O channels, MIDI editor, Elastic Time, Elastic Pitch, Workspace, AAX Native and AudioSuite
2015	Pro Tools 12	Pro Tools | Control (now Avid Control), Avid Dock, Avid VENUE S6L	available as monthly or yearly subscription; metadata tagging, updated I/O setup
2015	Pro Tools 12.1	Pro Tools | Control (now Avid Control), Avid Dock, Avid VENUE S6L	increased track count, AFL/PFL solo modes, copy to sends, native HEAT support (HD)
2015	Pro Tools 12.2	Pro Tools | Control (now Avid Control), Avid Dock, Avid VENUE S6L	VCAs, Disk Caching, advanced metering options unlocked to standard version
2015	Pro Tools 12.3	Pro Tools | Control (now Avid Control), Avid Dock, Avid VENUE S6L	Commit, fade presets, batch fades, clip graphic overlay
2015	Pro Tools 12.4	Pro Tools | Control (now Avid Control), Avid Dock, Avid VENUE S6L	Track Freeze, fade workflows
2016	Pro Tools 12.5		Cloud Collaboration, updated Avid Video Engine, send to playback (Interplay)
2016	Pro Tools 12.6		Clip Effects, Layered Editing, playlist improvements
2016	Pro Tools 12.7		project revision history, Workspace improvements software support for Pro Tools | MTRX
2017	Pro Tools 12.8	Pro Tools | MTRX	native Dolby Atmos integration and NEXIS optimization, Parallel Task Optimization (HD); Workspace and project enhancements; Smart Tool support for fade shapes; Cloud Collaboration (First)
2017	Pro Tools 12.8.2	Pro Tools | MTRX	Ambisonics VR Track support, Dolby Atmos enhancements, improved MIDI editing and recording features, Batch renaming features
2018	Pro Tools 2018.1		iLok Cloud support, Track Presets, assignable target playlist, retrospective MIDI record, MIDI editing enhancements, EQ Curve can be shown in the Mix window, improved Import Session Data first version to adopt year and month of release as a version numbering scheme
2018	Pro Tools 2018.4		"Pro Tools | HD" software line rebranded as "Pro Tools | Ultimate" bug fixes and stability improvements
2018	Pro Tools 2018.7		real-time search in track inserts and I/O (busses and sends), multiple selection within I/O and interface menus, playlist navigation shortcuts added, Relative Grid mode extended to cut, copy, paste, and merge, retrospective MIDI record enhancements, Low Latency Monitoring enhancements
2018	Pro Tools 2018.12		bug fixes and stability improvements
2019	Pro Tools 2019.5	Avid S4/S1	384–96 voices on native systems (Ultimate), 1024 MIDI tracks performance improvements (HDX / HD Native) continuous playback on most timeline and track interactions, key commands added
2019	Pro Tools 2019.6	Avid S4/S1	bug fixes
2019	Pro Tools 2019.10	Avid S4/S1	support for up to 130 outputs with Dolby Audio Bridge, multi-stem bounce in a single file (Ultimate) updated Avid Video Engine with 4K/60 fps support and H.264 playback performance improvements, steep breakpoint smoothing option added, AAF importing improvements, SMPTE ID support for wave files, key commands added
2019	Pro Tools 2019.12	Avid S4/S1	bug fixes and stability improvements
2020	Pro Tools 2020.3	Pro Tools | MTRX Studio	Folder Tracks, Resources section added in System Usage, H.264 performance improvements extended support for Pro Tools | MTRX Studio
2020	Pro Tools 2020.5	Pro Tools | MTRX Studio	optimizations for session storage on cloud services
2020	Pro Tools 2020.9	Pro Tools | MTRX Studio	Support for Ableton Link for timeline and transport synchronization over LAN support for SDII conversion to BWF WAV on import (macOS only), support for BWF RF64 audio import and playback; Cloud Collaboration improvements
2020	Pro Tools 2020.11	Pro Tools | Carbon	Dark Theme, Space Clips; integration of Melodyne Essential software, audio to MIDI conversion, QuickTime MOV import/export functionality support for low-latency AAX DSP mode (Hybrid Engine) with Pro Tools | Carbon interfaces 512 Master faders, support for Dolby Atmos ADM BWF export (Ultimate) performance improvements of offline bounces and playback with low buffer sizes
2020	Pro Tools 2020.12		Support for Audio to MIDI drag and drop from Workspace/Finder/File Explorer; Dolby Atmos ADM BWF export
2021	Pro Tools 2021.3	Pro Tools | Sync X	Virtual MIDI keyboard; Dark Theme, Dolby Atmos, Dynamic Transport and waveform display performance improvements HD driver updated to support Message Signaled Interrupts (MSI) support for Sync X master clock/synchronization device and macOS Big Sur
2021	Pro Tools 2021.6		2048 voices and 2048 audio tracks at all sample rates; Hybrid Engine support on HDX systems (Ultimate); 256 tracks at all sample rates (Standard); 64 I/O channels at all sample rates full UI customization, interchangeable track width; full support of plug-in drag between tracks of different widths support for delay compensation on side chains on non-HDX systems support of HEVC, AAC, ALAC and greater-than-stereo track widths for QuickTime video import/export Playback Engine performance and stability improvements (Intel-based Macs only): Intel Turbo Boost support, low buffer sizes optimizations, limit number of real-time threads Sync X and Sync HD improvements Apple Silicon support (Rosetta 2 only)
2021	Pro Tools 2021.7		Bug fixes only
2021	Pro Tools 2021.10		Flexible track routing (Ultimate), new UI customization parameters, support for Native Instruments Komplete Kontrol and Pro Tools | Carbon remote control Apple Silicon support for HDX, HD Native and Avid Video Engine (Rosetta)
2021	Pro Tools 2021.12		macOS Monterey support, video hardware support for Apple Silicon, bug fixes
2022	Pro Tools 2022.4		Pro Tools Subscription Tiers: Artist, Studio, Ultimate, custom keyboard shortcuts, Pro Tools command search
2022	Pro Tools 2022.5		Bug fixes only
2022	Pro Tools 2022.6		Miscellaneous improvements
2022	Pro Tools 2022.7		Bug fixes only
2022	Pro Tools 2022.9		Support for ARA 2.0 plugins, Aux I/O (Artist, Studio, Ultimate), release of Pro Tools Intro
2022	Pro Tools 2022.10	Pro Tools | Carbon Pre, MBOX Studio	Noise burst peak protection, support for Avid Carbon | Expanded systems, support for MBOX Studio
2022	Pro Tools 2022.12		macOS Ventura support, public beta of native Apple Silicon support, EUCON status control, improved Media Composer session export support
2023	Pro Tools 2023.3		Native Apple Silicon support, Elastique Pro Pitch/Time Algorithm, Bounce to M4A (AAC)
2023	Pro Tools 2023.6		Track Markers, Expanded Track Widths, Dolby Atmos Enhancements, Pro Tools | Carbon Surround Monitoring
2023	Pro Tools 2023.9		Pro Tools Sketch, Export Session Range, Insert Slot Re-Ordering
2023	Pro Tools 2023.12		Integrated Dolby Atmos Renderer, Memory Location Enhancements, I/O Path Colors
2024	Pro Tools 2024.3		macOS Sonoma support, MIDI Plugins and MIDI Enhancements, Edit Window Detachable Tabs, Copy/Paste MIDI Between Pro Tools and Sibelius, Dolby Atmos Improvements, Plugin Cache Improvements, Video Engine Universal Disable
2024	Pro Tools 2024.6		Expanded ARA 2 Integrations, Import Session Data, Dolby Atmos, Memory Locations Improvements, Export Media Composer Compatible Session
2024	Pro Tools 2024.10		macOS Sequoia support, Import Session Data Enhancements, Drag and Drop Clips to AAX Plugins, MIDI Playlists and Enhancements
2025	Pro Tools 2025.6		Splice Integration, Pro Tools Transcription and Speech to Text Engine, Drag and Drop Multi Clips to AAX Plugins, Modernized Dashboard
2025	Pro Tools 2025.10		Soundflow Integration, Sony 360RA WalkMix Immersive Support
2025	Pro Tools 2025.12		UWA Audio Vivid Support
2026	Pro Tools 2026.4		Track Pinning, Transcription Improvements, MPEG-H Renderer Support, Pro Tools Immersive Panner (for MPEG-H and Audio Vivid Renderers), Batch File Rename
2026	Pro Tools 2026.11		MIDI Polyphonic Expression, Pro Tools Extensions, Pro Tools Stem Separator, Windows HiDPI Scaling Support and Dark Mode Enhancements
2026	Pro Tools 2026.11		macOS Golden Gate support, bug fixes (2026.11.1)

== See also ==
- Comparison of multitrack recording software
- List of music software
