= IXML =

Sound metadata standard for Broadcast Wave Format

iXML is an open standard for the inclusion of location sound metadata in Broadcast Wave audio files, video files and also IP video and audio streams. This includes things like Scene, Take and Notes information.

It is the result of extended discussions between the various manufacturers of field recorders and editing systems. It is designed to standardise the exchange of metadata between these systems.

The iXML specification describes an WAV RIFF chunk in BWF files which contains standard XML data following the iXML specification. It also introduces the concept of using iXML in IP video streams such as NDI.

Prior to the development of the iXML specification, the film and TV industry relied on the BWF bext description chunk which was used differently by many vendors to roughly encode some small metadata, but was invariably undefined, with too little space for full information. Whilst many systems tried to read what they could from the bext data, because of no specification and limited space, bext usefulness was limited.

== History ==
The iXML concept was born during a meeting of various vendors, including manufacturers of field recorders, NLEs and DAWs, hosted by the Institute of Broadcast Sound, in London, on 8 July 2004. The "i" in iXML recognises the part the IBS played in bringing together such a diverse blend of normally competitive manufacturers to collectively solve the increasingly difficult problem of metadata interchange, with an elegant, capable and completely public specification.

Following initial discussions between Mark Gilbert of Gallery, John Ellwood of SynchroArts and J.P Beauviala of Aaton at the IBS meeting, the iXML 1.0 Specification was developed, drawn up and published by Mark Gilbert of Gallery UK at http://www.ixml.info. The iXML Specification is maintained by Gallery UK, and changes made are based on discussions by the iXML committee.

Soon after the IBS meeting, Gallery shipped Metacorder which was the first iXML compatible device. Mark Gilbert continued to promote the iXML format all over the world during 2004 and 2005 and gradually products emerged from other vendors. Other early adopters of iXML included SynchroArt's TITAN utility, and HHB's Portadrive field recorder.

In 2019 Gallery introduced the notion of using iXML in NDI based video/audio streams and the iXML 3.0 specification was announced which will define this.

== In Use ==
Today, dozens of industry standard audio products support iXML with 100% interchange of metadata between systems. This includes all the current location field recorders (for which the spec was originally designed), several DAW applications (including Digidesign Pro Tools, Sony Vegas, Cockos Reaper and Steinberg Cubase/Nuendo) and various utilities. In late 2007, Apple Inc. added iXML support to their Final Cut Pro nonlinear video editor, which is used by more than 800,000 users worldwide. iXML support was introduced with version 6.02 of Final Cut Pro.
