= 96000 =

96000 may refer to:

- "96,000", a song from the 2007 musical In the Heights by Lin-Manuel Miranda
- Motorola 96000, family of digital signal processor (DSP) chips produced by Motorola
- The number 96,000 (see 90,000)
- 96,000 AD, the last year in the 96th millennium (see Timeline of the far future)
