= Institute of Sound =

Institute of Sound may refer to:

- British Institute of Recorded Sound in London, England
- Institute of Professional Sound
- Institute of Sound and Vibration Research at the University of Southampton
- Mexican Institute of Sound
- Norwegian Institute of Recorded Sound in Stavanger
