= E-mu Emax =

Series of digital sampling synthesizers

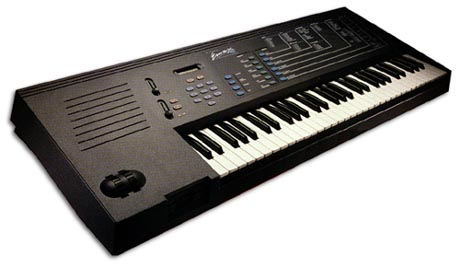
E-mu Emax (1986)

The Emax was a line of samplers, developed, manufactured, and sold by E-mu Systems from 1986 to 1995. Sold alongside their more expensive Emulator II and III samplers, the Emax line was one of a wave of "affordable" samplers that debuted around the period which also included the Akai S-612, Ensoniq Mirage, Korg DSS-1 and Sequential Prophet 2000.

The name Emax can refer to one of two specific models, the Emax (which was grey), and the Emax II (which was black). The Emax is sometimes referred to as the Emax I or the Emax 1000 to avoid confusion between the two models. (Note: Although E-mu Systems never referred to it this way, there is an internal control label that says "EMAX 1000" inside every unit.)

== Emax ==
The original Emax was released in 1986, as a low cost version of the Emulator II. The base model cost $2,995; a rack version was also available for $2,695. Although it was fairly similar to the Emulator II in sampling specifications, the Emax used much more reliable parts, and stored sounds on 3½" floppy disks, as opposed to the more antiquated 5¼" floppy disks that the Emulator used.

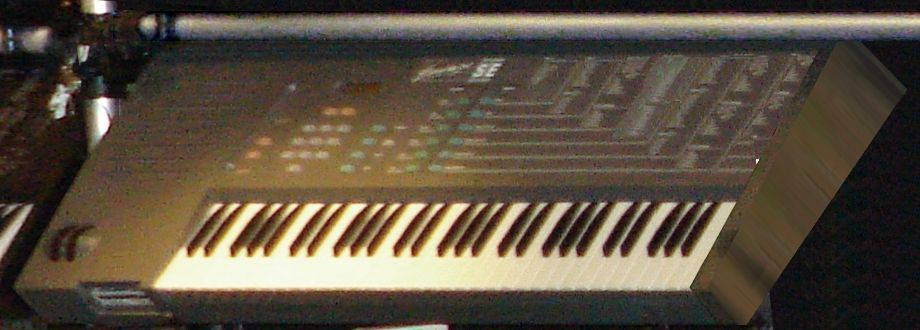
E-mu Emax SE (1988)

Several upgrades were available for the Emax during its lifetime. The Emax HD featured a 20 megabyte hard drive for storing samples. The Emax SE added an additive synthesis engine that let the user create sounds from scratch. The Emax Plus added external SCSI device capability in addition to the other updates.

Sample memory remained the same at 512 KB for all models. SCSI can be retrofitted to second and third revision motherboards and was standard on the final model the Plus. The Emax was discontinued in 1989 and replaced by Emax II.

== Emax II ==
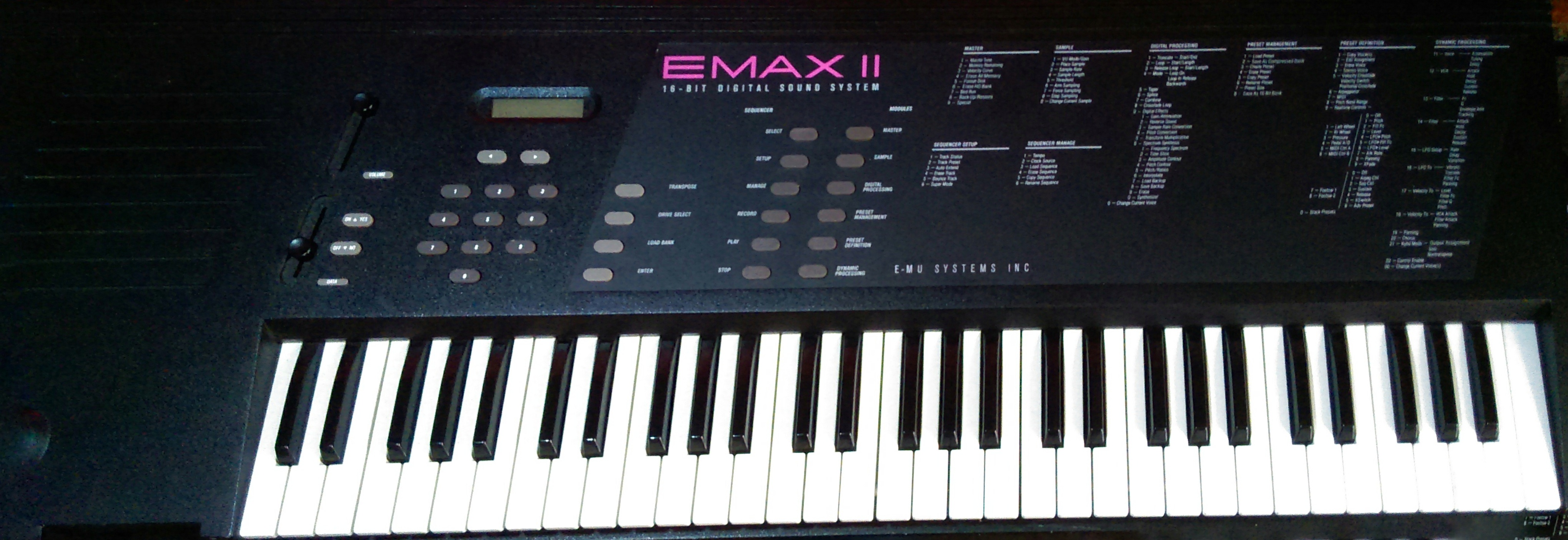
E-mu Emax II

The Emax was replaced in Fall 1989 by the Emax II and Emax II Turbo. Although the Emax II was a true 16-bit sampler with more polyphony, it also used digital filters and components, which sounded noticeably different from the original's analogue filter chips. The Emax II also sported a higher pricetag; a base model cost $3,595, while a fully expanded model could cost as much as $8,000. Nevertheless, the Emax II found a niche among many professionals due to its large and varied sample library, and it enjoyed one of the longest production runs of any E-mu product.

The Emax II has different versions, labeled between 2201 and 2214, including mono and stereo versions. The Emax II Turbo, released in 1990, added more built-in sample memory (8 Mb from factory) and an internal SCSI Hard Disk.

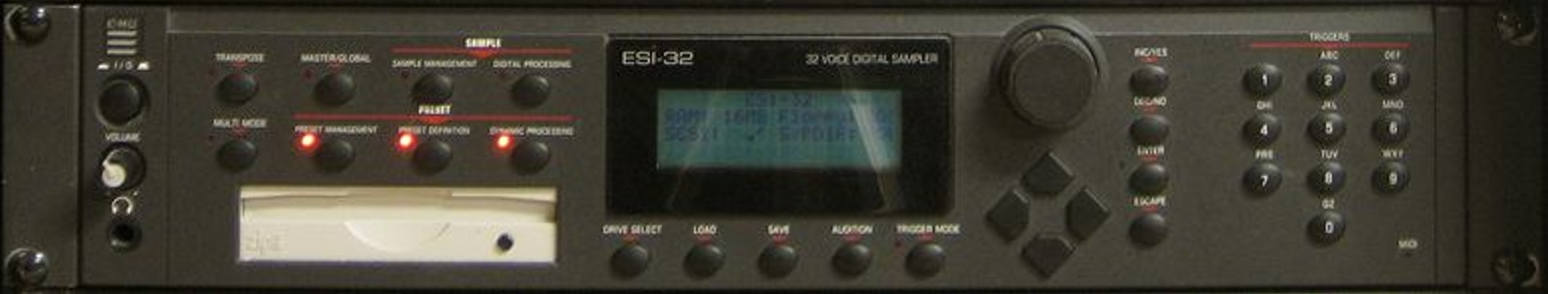
E-mu ESi-32 (1995)

In 1995, the Emax II was discontinued, replaced by the rackmountable ESi-32, in 1997 the ESI-4000, and later the ESI-2000.

== Notable users ==
- Alphaville – used an Emax
- Beastie Boys – used on their 1989 album Paul's Boutique
- Cabaret Voltaire
- Depeche Mode – all three keyboard players can be seen operating Emax keyboards on their 1989 live film, 101, and Emax II keyboards in the Devotional film (1993).
- Faith No More
- Fear Factory
- Ice MC
- Johnny Hates Jazz – used an Emax on their 1988 album Turn Back the Clock
- KMFDM – used an Emax
- Krush – used on the 1987 single "House Arrest"
- Little Angels – Jimmy Dickinson used an Emax SE on all Little Angels records, including Jam
- Los Prisioneros
- Mats/Morgan Band – used an Emax II
- Minimal Compact
- Meat Beat Manifesto
- Mouse on Mars
- Nine Inch Nails – used an Emax SE extensively on their 1989 album Pretty Hate Machine
- Type O Negative
- Die Krupps – used an Emax II
- Orbital
- Prince
- Psychic TV - Fred Giannelli
- Tony Toni Tone
- Saint Etienne – credited with using the Emax on their 1991 album Foxbase Alpha
- Skinny Puppy
- Steve Roach
- Tyske Ludder – used an Emax II
- U2
- Tom Waits – credited with using the Emax on his 1993 album The Black Rider
- Wax – used during their Top of the Pops performance of "Bridge to Your Heart" in 1987
- The Whispers
- The Wiggles – credited with using the Emax on their 1991 album The Wiggles
- White Town – used Emax II extensively on the 1996 single "Your Woman"
