= AES31 =

Standard for the interchange of digital audio projects

AES31 is a standard developed by the Audio Engineering Society for the interchange of digital audio projects between different systems. The primary purpose of the standard is to allow exchange of audio editing projects between digital audio workstations (DAWs). The standard is divided into three parts, the most critical of which is the project interchange format, which defines a standard for edit decision lists.

== Parts ==
Part 1 - Disk format
Ensures the ability to read files across platforms.

Part 2 - File format
Specifies use of monaural Broadcast Wave Format files

Part 3 - Project interchange
Provides a method of exchanging edit data in a text format. This allows an audio edit in one DAW to be opened in another, with little or no difference in the mix. The standard focuses on simple and accurate parsing, and human readability.

== Timecode ==
The standard describes a time-code character format (TCF), which is used to express time code information in character notation. It enables a sample-accurate time to be specified within a 24-hour period.

The format is defined as HHiMMiSSiFFissss, which is composed of hours (HH), minutes (MM), seconds (SS), frames (FF) and samples (ssss), separated by indicators (i). The character used for each indicator signifies the frame count/time base, film framing, video field/time code type, and sample rate, respectively.

== Formatting ==
The project interchange standard uses plain text files with a custom markup language called edit decision markup language (EDML). A file is divided into sections using XML-style tags, each of which can contain different keywords which are surrounded by parenthesis. An example of the language can be seen below:

    <VERSION>
        (ADL_ID)           ""
        (ADL_UID)          e5135ed0-5bc7-4087-8674-5a97cf4534e2
        (VER_ADL_VERSION)  01.01.00
        (VER_CREATOR)      "SADiE"
        (VER_CRTR)         05.06.02
    </VERSION>
