= Institute of Professional Sound =

Organisation for audio professionals

- Abbreviation: IPS
- Formation: 1977
- Type: Professional body
- Purpose: Charitable association
- Headquarters: Hampshire, England
- Region served: Worldwide
- President: Adrian Bishop-Laggett (died 2026)
- Vice President: John L. Andrews
- Chairman: Simon Bishop
- Website: www.ips.org.uk
- Formerly called: Institute of Broadcast Sound

The Institute of Professional Sound, previously the Institute of Broadcast Sound, is an organisation for audio professionals. The organisation provides opportunities for training and conferencing to assist in maintaining high standards in all areas of professional audio operations. The organisation is based in the UK.

The organisation was founded in 1977 by sound balancers in BBC Television and Radio and Independent TV, when its membership comprised audio practitioners working in all areas of broadcast audio including radio, location, and post-production sound. On 1 January 2012, the Institute of Professional Sound was adopted as the new name of the organisation in order to attract a wider membership which is not exclusively from broadcasting.

== History ==
The Institute of Professional Sound was established in 1977 as the Institute of Broadcast Sound, by individuals working in radio and television, who recognised a need for a coordinated means for the exchange of innovative ideas between practitioners in the field of broadcast audio. The organisation serves as a catalyst to promote collaborative initiatives between manufacturers of digital audio recording and editing equipment. Listed among the successes of the organisation is the File Exchange Initiative, from which the iXML specification was established, setting an open standard for the inclusion of location sound metadata in Broadcast Wave audio files.

== Projects ==
=== Mentoring ===
The Institute of Professional Sound offers mentoring and career enhancement opportunities for entry-level employees, college graduates, and seasoned professionals. The mentoring program is designed to coordinate members who desire to assist their colleagues to progress and succeed in their career with individuals seeking the advice and support of more experienced practitioners in the industry.

=== Training ===
The organisation provides training forums and conferences for its members which introduce members to emerging technologies, along with seminars on microphone placement and other operational issues.

=== Ofcom radio frequency spectrum ===
The Institute contributes to the ongoing discussions with Ofcom, regarding the changes to the management and use of the radio frequency spectrum, where it represents several hundred members who are independent users of radio microphone and associated equipment.

=== Email conferencing ===
Started in June 1995 with just 10 participants, the IPS's Internet email conference IBSNET has over 500 participants (as of 2012). Members include individuals from the UK, Germany, Austria, United States, Malaysia, Australia, Japan, and New Zealand. The conference provides opportunities for comment and feedback regarding professional standards, working conditions, visa requirements, and radio microphone frequencies in other countries, in addition to putting location recordists in contact with one another and with the dubbing mixers, who may ultimately use their work.
