= Motorola 96000 =

Family of digital signal processor chips produced by Motorola

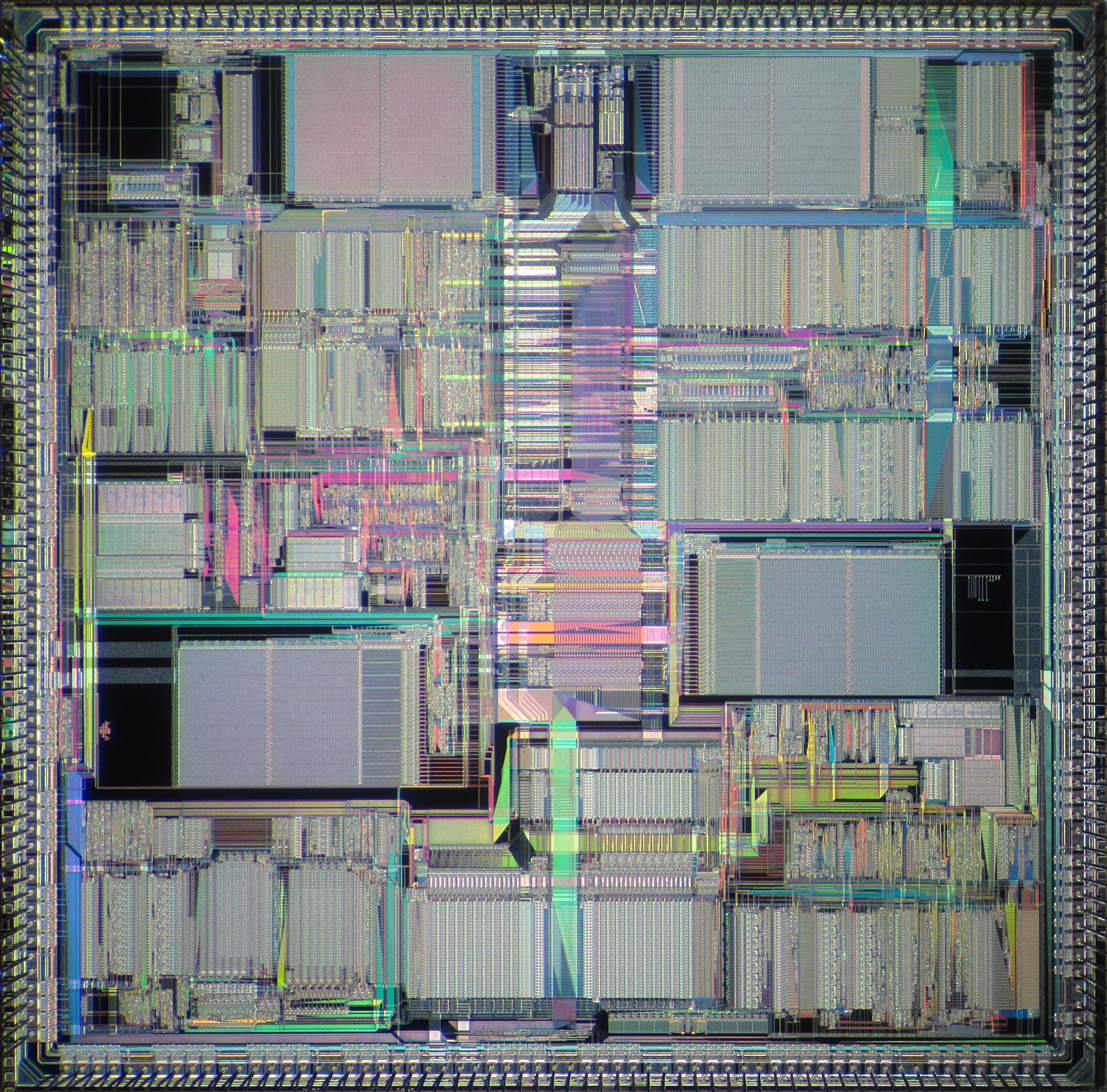
Die of Motorola DSP96002.

The Motorola 96XXX (aka 96000, 96K) is a family of digital signal processor (DSP) chips produced by Motorola. They are based on the earlier Motorola 56000 and remain software compatible with them, but have been updated to a full single-precision (32-bit) floating point implementation that is compliant with the IEEE 754-1985 standard.

Many of the design features of the 96000 remain similar to the 56000. In architectures 96000, the stack area is allocated in a separate address space, which is called "Stack Memory Space", distinct from the main memory address space. The stack, which is used when subroutine calls and "long interrupts", is fifteen words in depth. While the 56000 is equipped with two 56-bit accumulators, each of which can be partitioned into one 8-bit extension register and two 24-bit registers, the 96000 is equipped with ten 96-bit registers, each of which can be partitioned into three 32-bit sub-registers.

Unlike the 56K, the 96000 "family" consisted of a single model, the 96002. It was not as successful as the 56K, and was only produced for a short period of time. Today its role is filled by products based on the Motorola StarCore series.

The 96000 offers an Assembler and an Instruction set simulator as part of its development tool.
