= Track automation =

Time-based control in audio or video production

Track automation or sometimes only automation refers to the recording or handling of time-based controlling data in time-based computer applications such as digital audio workstations, video editing software and computer animation software.

== Examples ==
=== Multitrack audio software ===
In modern DAWs every parameter that exists can usually be automatized, be it settings for a track's volume, applied filters or a software synthesizer. Example automations in this context include:

- The volume of a track can sometimes or constantly change (fade-in/out/over)
- The panning of a sound might change
- A filter sweep (more or less intensive filter, or the frequency limits might change)

To achieve automation, either the user turns some knobs or faders on a physical controller connected to the computer or the user can set key frames with the mouse, between which the computer interpolates, or the user can draw entire data curves.

=== Animation software ===
The user sets some keyframes for i.e. position/rotation/size of an object or the position/angle/focus of a camera, and this movement data can be altered over time.

=== Video editing software ===
Blending between 2 clips. The track automation curve affects how one image changes into the other, be it slow/fast with/without acceleration, maybe even back and forth if one uses a Sinus-like wave.

== See also ==
- Control voltage
- MIDI
