= Truespeech =

Truespeech is a proprietary audio codec produced by the DSP Group. It is designed for encoding voice data at low bitrates (8.5 kbps for 8 kHz samples), and to be embedded into DSP chips. Truespeech had been integrated into Windows Media Player in older versions of Windows, but no longer supported since Windows Vista. It was also the format used by the voice chat features of Yahoo! Messenger. It is implemented through the Tsd32.dll

A Truespeech decoder was implemented in the 0.5 release of FFmpeg.
