= Virtual mixer =

A Virtual Mixer is a software application that runs on a computer or other digital audio system. Providing the same functionality of a digital or analog mixing console, a virtual mixer takes the audio outputs of many separate tracks or live sources and combines them into a pair of stereo outputs or other routed subgroups for auxiliary outputs.

== History ==
Around the mid 1990s, computers achieved a level of processing power that allowed for professional recordings to be done digitally. In the following decade, many artists began recording their own music in home studios with the aid of DAW (digital audio workstation) software like GarageBand or ProTools. It was this move away from high end studios and the rise of computing power in personal computers that gave rise to virtual mixers that required minimal to no physical interface.

== Design ==
The design of most virtual mixers is modeled after physical mixers. The individual channel strips are arranged side-by-side and the user is given control over level and pan. There is also a single master fader for the stereo output. The actual controls are also modeled after physical mixers, featuring faders and knobs that can be controlled using a mouse and keyboard shortcuts.

Each channel displays a decibel meter and slots for optional third-party plugins. These plugins range from built-in effects to EQ, compression, and gates. These plugins can be implemented a number of ways. Each channel allows for plugins to be added via dropdown menus from a number of slots. Through this method, plugins are applied to individual channels. Alternatively, plugins can be applied to a number of channels by busing the desired channels to another track. In this case, the effectiveness of the effect can be controlled through the fader of the bused channel.

== See also ==
- Digital Mixing Console
- Music Sequencer
- MIDI Controller
- Plugin
- Audio Units
- VST
