= Korg DSS-1 =

Polyphonic synthesizer

DSS-1
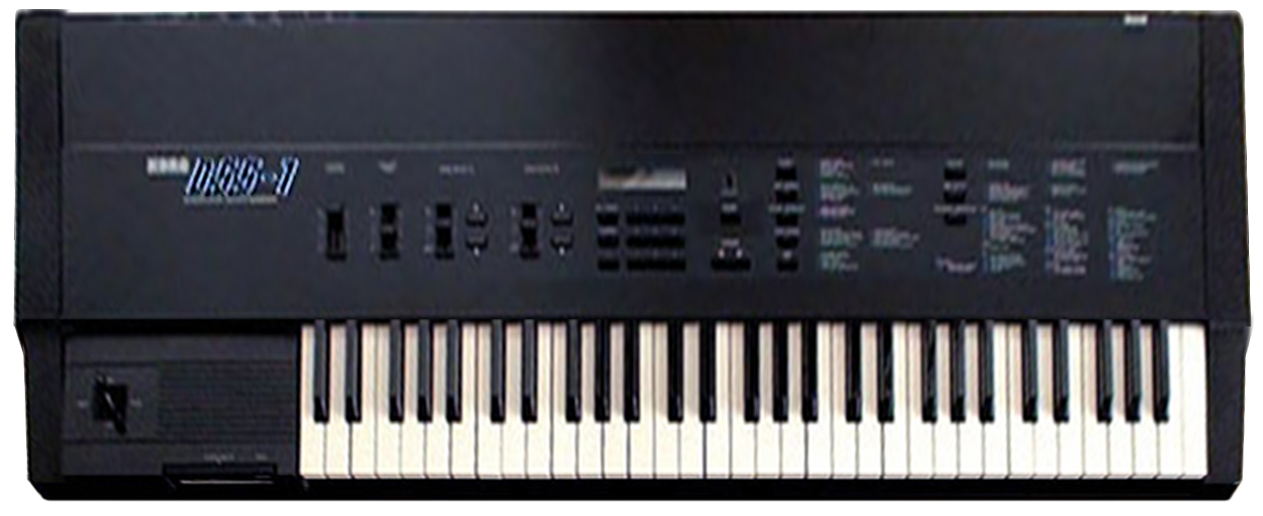
- Manufacturer: Korg
- Dates: 1986
- Price: £2,259

Technical specifications
- Polyphony: 8
- Timbrality: Monotimbral but multitimbrality can be obtained using multisamples spread across keyboard
- Oscillator: 12-bit waveforms/samples
- LFO: 2
- Synthesis type: Digital Sample-based Subtractive
- Filter: switchable 2-pole and 4-pole resonant low-pass
- Attenuator: ADBSSR
- Aftertouch expression: yes
- Velocity expression: yes
- Storage memory: 256kb-2Mb
- Effects: Stereo digital delay

Input/output
- Keyboard: 61-key
- Left-hand control: Joystick
- External control: MIDI

The Korg DSS-1 (Digital Sampling Synthesizer) is a polyphonic sampling synthesizer released by Korg in 1986. As Korg's initial entry into the sampling market, the DSS-1 combines sampling, additive synthesis, and waveform drawing with an analog signal path. Prior to the mid 1980s, sampling was an area of sound design dominated by companies like Fairlight and E-mu. The arrival of the relatively low-cost Ensoniq Mirage in 1984 had begun a tide of major synthesizer manufacturers like Yamaha and Casio beginning to explore sampling, with the DSS-1 being Korg's first offering. Korg did not stay long in the sampling arena; the DSS-1 (along with the rackmount DSM-1) was the company's only sampler until 1998 when Korg introduced sampling options on their Triton and Trinity series of workstations. .

== Sounds and features ==
The DSS-1 features a five-octave keyboard, a 3.5-inch disk drive, and a performance joystick on the left side. The top panel includes sliders for Master volume and tuning, data entry sliders A and B with step buttons, an LCD screen, a keypad, cursor buttons, and various operational buttons. It combines three synthesis methods: sampling, additive harmonic synthesis, and hand-drawn waveform creation.

The sampler is 12-bit and supports fixed sampling rates of 16, 24, 32, and 48kHz. The maximum duration for recording varies, with the longest being 16 seconds at 16kHz and the shortest at 5.5 seconds at 48kHz. To record, users navigate a menu system to choose the sampling rate, determine the number of divisions within a sample, and select the key number for each sample. Features for looping include an automatic looping function, as well as crossfade and bidirectional looping options for seamless loop creation. The DSS-1 also features a simple additive harmonic synthesis engine that allows users to create single-cycle waveforms by either drawing them with a data slider or by setting the relative amplitude levels of 128 sine waves to create complex waveforms as well as the standard sawtooth, square and sine waves.

The DSS-1's synthesis structure resembles that of a traditional subtractive analog synthesizer, featuring two oscillators, voltage-controlled filters (VCF) and voltage-controlled amplifiers (VCA). The VCFs can be switched between 24dB and 12dB per octave slopes and incorporate keyboard tracking and an extended ADBSSR (Attack, Decay, Breakpoint, Slope, Sustain, Release) envelope generator that Korg first introduced with the Poly-800. This envelope enables the insertion of an additional attack or decay phase before reaching the sustain segment. The DSS-1 also borrows the auto-bend feature from the DW-8000, which creates an automatic initial pitch bend towards the played note with adjustable speed.

Velocity sensitivity in the DSS-1 can modulate the VCF cutoff, VCA level, and the envelopes' attack, decay, and slope, along with the degree of auto-bend. It can also control oscillator switching or crossfading, which is particularly useful for sampled sounds. Aftertouch can introduce vibrato and VCF modulation, as well as modulate the VCA level.

There are two individual sine wave low-frequency oscillators (LFOs), one for pitch modulation and the other for VCF modulation. There are also two separate modulation sources for the built-in twin digital delays. The DSS-1 also includes a four-way joystick for performance adjustments, enabling pitch bending and filter manipulation horizontally, as well as vibrato and filter modulation vertically.

The mono signal from the synthesizer section is then routed through two internal digital delay effects, each linked to an independent audio output for stereo functionality. The delays offer controls for delay time, modulation, and feedback, enabling a range of effects including chorus, echo and slapback reverb. Users can configure the delays to operate either in series or parallel and invert the phase of the second unit's modulation wave to produce stereo effects. A built-in EQ effect offers treble and bass adjustments to help shape the output sound.

Sounds in the DSS-1 are categorized into Samples, Multi Sounds, and Systems. A Sample is a sound you record using the synthesizer's input. A System is a collection of up to 32 programs that can be stored and accessed simultaneously for ease of use during live performances. Multi Sounds allow for the combination of several samples, each assigned to specific keys on the keyboard. This configuration enables a layered or split keyboard setup, where different sounds can be played in different sections of the keyboard.

The DSS-1 has its operating system stored on ROM chips, so if you lose your floppy disks you can still boot the system up (unlike the E-mu Emulator, Ensoniq Mirage, and early Roland samplers which required you always have a floppy disk containing the OS). However, each time you boot up the DSS-1 you will not have any sounds available until you load a system into memory from floppy disk. This can usually take anywhere from 20 to 40 seconds, depending on the size and number of multisamples contained in that system. The floppies that the DSS-1 understands are the older DSDD (double-sided double-density) disks that were also used on the Ensoniq Mirage and on early Macintosh computers.

== Korg DSM-1 ==
The Korg DSM-1, released in 1987, is a rack-mounted variant of the DSS-1, boasting a memory capacity of 1Mb—four times greater than its predecessor—and featuring a quicker operating system, a high-density disk drive, individual outputs, and a multitimbral mode. While it doubled the polyphony to 16 notes (which reduces back to eight when layering two voices for performances), it lacks the digital delay lines, the second oscillator (and then oscillator sync) and filter resonance that largely defined the DSS-1's unique sound. Nonetheless, it maintains some compatibility with DSS-1 disks.
