= Broadcast Wave Format =

Audio file format family based on Microsoft WAV

- Filename extension: .bwf; .wav
- Internet media type: audio/x-wav
- Developed by: European Broadcasting Union (EBU)
- Initial release: 1997
- Latest release: Version 2 May 2011; 15 years ago
- Type of format: audio file format, container format
- Extended from: WAV
- Extended to: RF64
- Standard: EBU - TECH 3285 Specification of the Broadcast Wave Format (BWF); ITU-R BS.1352-3 File format for the exchange of audio programme materials with metadata on information technology media
- Website: Broadcast Wave Format (BWF) user guide

Broadcast Wave Format (BWF) is an extension of the popular Microsoft WAV audio format and is the recording format of most file-based non-linear digital recorders used for motion picture, radio and television production. It was first specified by the European Broadcasting Union in 1997, and updated in 2001 and 2003. It has been accepted as the ITU recommendation ITU-R BS.1352-3, Annex 1.

The purpose of this file format is the addition of metadata to facilitate the seamless exchange of sound data between different computer platforms and applications. It specifies the format of metadata, allowing audio processing elements to identify themselves, document their activities, and support timecode to enable synchronization with other recordings. This metadata is stored as extension chunks in a standard digital audio WAV file.

BWF is the recommended format for digitizing sound files by the International Association of Sound and Audiovisual Archives.

Files conforming to the Broadcast Wave Format specification have names ending with the filename extension .WAV.

== Details ==
In addition to the common WAVE chunks, the following extension chunks can appear in a Broadcast Wave Format file:

- Original Bext chunk (Broadcast Extension - bext)
- iXML chunk (iXML)
- Quality chunk (qlty)
- MPEG audio extension chunk (mext)
- Peak Envelope chunk (levl)
- link chunk (link)
- axml chunk (axml)

Since the only difference between a BWF and a "normal" WAV is the extended information in the file header (Bext-Chunk, Coding-History, etc), a BWF does not require a special player for playback.

This compatibility also preserves the filesize limitation that WAV files have (4 GB of audio data per data chunk). In order to be able to store audio which would exceed this limit, 2 different chunks exist, allowing the audio material to be spread across several files: cont and link (see list above)

Since there is no official naming convention for these subsequent files, and it is still desirable to see at a glance which ones belong to a continuous piece of audio, a lot of programs apply a numbering scheme to the file suffix: .wav, .w01, .w02, ..., .wNN.

Each of those segments is a regular Wave/BWF file, but players that are aware of the continue/link chunk will treat all segments as one single, long piece of audio when opening the first segment ".wav".

As an extension, RF64 is a BWF-compatible multichannel file format enabling file sizes to exceed 4 GB, which was specified in 2006.

The axml (additional XML) chunk allows users to incorporate data compliant with the XML format with the audio; the chunk may contain data fragments from one or more schemas.

In August 2012, the European Broadcasting Union published a specification for embedding International Standard Recording Code (ISRC) in the axml chunk of the Broadcast Wave Format.

BWF is specified for use in MXF by SMPTE standard 382. BWF is specified for use in AES31.

== See also ==
- RF64, A BWF-compatible multichannel file format enabling file sizes to exceed 4 GB
- WAV
- MXF, Material eXchange Format
- Advanced Authoring Format
