= Comparison of data-serialization formats =

This is a comparison of data serialization formats, various ways to convert complex objects to sequences of bits. It does not include markup languages used exclusively as document file formats.

== Overview ==
Name	Creator-maintainer	Based on	Standardized?	Specification	Binary?	Human-readable?	Supports references?^{e}	Schema-IDL?	Standard APIs	Supports zero-copy operations
Apache Arrow	Apache Software Foundation	—N/a	De facto	Arrow Columnar Format	Yes	No	Yes	Built-in	C, C++, C#, Go, Java, JavaScript, Julia, Matlab, Python, R, Ruby, Rust, Swift	Yes
Apache Avro	Apache Software Foundation	—N/a	No	Apache Avro™ Specification	Yes	Partial^{g}	—N/a	Built-in	C, C#, C++, Java, PHP, Python, Ruby	—N/a
Apache Parquet	Apache Software Foundation	—N/a	No	Apache Parquet	Yes	No	No	—N/a	Java, Python, C++	No
Apache Thrift	Facebook (creator); Apache (maintainer)	—N/a	No	Original whitepaper	Yes	Partial^{c}	No	Built-in	C++, Java, Python, PHP, Ruby, Erlang, Perl, Haskell, C#, Cocoa, JavaScript, Node.js, Smalltalk, OCaml, Delphi and other languages	—N/a
ASN.1	ISO, IEC, ITU-T	—N/a	Yes	ISO/IEC 8824 / ITU-T X.680 (syntax) and ISO/IEC 8825 / ITU-T X.690 (encoding rules) series. X.680, X.681, and X.683 define syntax and semantics.	BER, DER, PER, OER, or custom via ECN	XER, JER, GSER, or custom via ECN	Yes^{f}	Built-in	—N/a	OER
Bencode	Bram Cohen (creator); BitTorrent, Inc. (maintainer)	—N/a	De facto as BEP	Part of BitTorrent protocol specification	Except numbers and delimiters, being ASCII	No	No	No	No	No
BSON	MongoDB	JSON	No	BSON Specification	Yes	No	No	No	No	No
Cap'n Proto	Kenton Varda	—N/a	No	Cap'n Proto Encoding Spec	Yes	Partial^{h}	No	Yes	No	Yes
CBOR	Carsten Bormann, P. Hoffman	MessagePack	Yes	RFC 8949	Yes	No	Yes, through tagging	CDDL	FIDO2	No
Comma-separated values (CSV)	RFC author: Yakov Shafranovich	—N/a	Myriad informal variants	RFC 4180 (among others)	No	Yes	No	No	No	No
Common Data Representation (CDR)	Object Management Group	—N/a	Yes	General Inter-ORB Protocol	Yes	No	Yes	Yes	Ada, C, C++, Java, Cobol, Lisp, Python, Ruby, Smalltalk	—N/a
D-Bus Message Protocol	freedesktop.org	—N/a	Yes	D-Bus Specification	Yes	No	No	Partial (Signature strings)	Yes	—N/a
Efficient XML Interchange (EXI)	W3C	XML, Efficient XML	Yes	Efficient XML Interchange (EXI) Format 1.0	Yes	XML	XPointer, XPath	XML Schema	DOM, SAX, StAX, XQuery, XPath	—N/a
Extensible Data Notation (edn)	Rich Hickey / Clojure community	Clojure	Yes	Official edn spec	No	Yes	No	No	Clojure, Ruby, Go, C++, Javascript, Java, CLR, ObjC, Python	No
FlatBuffers	Google	—N/a	No	Flatbuffers GitHub	Yes	Apache Arrow	Partial (internal to the buffer)	Yes	C++, Java, C#, Go, Python, Rust, JavaScript, PHP, C, Dart, Lua, TypeScript	Yes
Fast Infoset	ISO, IEC, ITU-T	XML	Yes	ITU-T X.891 and ISO/IEC 24824-1:2007	Yes	No	XPointer, XPath	XML schema	DOM, SAX, XQuery, XPath	—N/a
FHIR	Health Level 7	REST basics	Yes	Fast Healthcare Interoperability Resources	Yes	Yes	Yes	Yes	Hapi for FHIR JSON, XML, Turtle	No
INI	Microsoft	?	No	Several different exists	No	Yes	?	?	?	?
Ion	Amazon	JSON	No	The Amazon Ion Specification	Yes	Yes	No	Ion schema	C, C#, Go, Java, JavaScript, Python, Rust	—N/a
Java serialization	Oracle Corporation	—N/a	Yes	Java Object Serialization	Yes	No	Yes	No	Yes	—N/a
JSON	Douglas Crockford	JavaScript syntax	Yes	STD 90/RFC 8259 (ancillary: RFC 6901, RFC 6902), ECMA-404, ISO/IEC 21778:2017	No, but see BSON, Smile, UBJSON	Yes	JSON Pointer (RFC 6901), or alternately, JSONPath, JPath, JSPON, json:select(); and JSON-LD	Partial (JSON Schema Proposal, ASN.1 with JER, Kwalify Archived 2021-08-12 at the Wayback Machine, Rx, JSON-LD	Partial (Clarinet, JSONQuery / RQL, JSONPath), JSON-LD	No
MessagePack	Sadayuki Furuhashi	JSON (loosely)	No	MessagePack format specification	Yes	No	No	No	No	Yes
Netstrings	Dan Bernstein	—N/a	No	netstrings.txt	Except ASCII delimiters	Yes	No	No	No	Yes
OGDL	Rolf Veen	?	No	Specification	Binary specification	Yes	Path specification	Schema WD		—N/a
OPC-UA Binary	OPC Foundation	—N/a	No	opcfoundation.org	Yes	No	Yes	No	No	—N/a
OpenDDL	Eric Lengyel	C, PHP	No	OpenDDL.org	No	Yes	Yes	No	OpenDDL library	—N/a
PHP serialization format	PHP Group	—N/a	Yes	No	Yes	Yes	Yes	No	Yes	—N/a
Pickle (Python)	Guido van Rossum	Python	De facto as PEPs	PEP 3154 – Pickle protocol version 4	Yes	No	Yes	No	Yes	No
Property list	NeXT (creator); Apple (maintainer)	?	Partial	Public DTD for XML format	Yes^{a}	Yes^{b}	No	?	Cocoa, CoreFoundation, OpenStep, GnuStep	No
Protocol Buffers (protobuf)	Google	—N/a	No	Developer Guide: Encoding, proto2 specification, and proto3 specification	Yes	Yes^{d}	No	Built-in	C++, Java, C#, Python, Go, Ruby, Objective-C, C, Dart, Perl, PHP, R, Rust, Scala, Swift, Julia, D, ActionScript, Delphi, Elixir, Elm, Erlang, GopherJS, Haskell, Haxe, JavaScript, Kotlin, Lua, Matlab, Mercurt, OCaml, Prolog, Solidity, TypeScript, Vala, Visual Basic	No
S-expressions	John McCarthy (original); Ron Rivest (internet draft)	Lisp, Netstrings	Largely de facto	"S-Expressions" Archived 2013-10-07 at the Wayback Machine Internet Draft	Yes, canonical representation	Yes, advanced transport representation	No	No		—N/a
Smile	Tatu Saloranta	JSON	No	Smile Format Specification	Yes	No	Yes	Partial (JSON Schema Proposal, other JSON schemas/IDLs)	Partial (via JSON APIs implemented with Smile backend, on Jackson, Python)	—N/a
SOAP	W3C	XML	Yes	W3C Recommendations: SOAP/1.1; SOAP/1.2	Partial (Efficient XML Interchange, Binary XML, Fast Infoset, MTOM, XSD base64 data)	Yes	Built-in id/ref, XPointer, XPath	WSDL, XML schema	DOM, SAX, XQuery, XPath	—N/a
Structured Data eXchange Formats	Max Wildgrube	—N/a	Yes	RFC 3072	Yes	No	No	No		—N/a
TOML	Tom Preston-Werner	INI file format	Yes	Version 1.1.0; Latest version	No	Yes	?	?	?	?
UBJSON	The Buzz Media, LLC	JSON, BSON	No	ubjson.org	Yes	No	No	No	No	—N/a
eXternal Data Representation (XDR)	Sun Microsystems (creator); IETF (maintainer)	—N/a	Yes	STD 67/RFC 4506	Yes	No	Yes	Yes	Yes	—N/a
XML	W3C	SGML	Yes	W3C Recommendations: 1.0 (Fifth Edition); 1.1 (Second Edition)	Partial (Efficient XML Interchange, Binary XML, Fast Infoset, XSD base64 data)	Yes	XPointer, XPath	XML schema, RELAX NG	DOM, SAX, XQuery, XPath	—N/a
XML-RPC	Dave Winer	XML	No	XML-RPC Specification	No	Yes	No	No	No	No
YAML	Clark Evans, Ingy döt Net, and Oren Ben-Kiki	C, Java, Perl, Python, Ruby, Email, HTML, MIME, URI, XML, SAX, SOAP, JSON	No	Version 1.2	No	Yes	Yes	Partial (Kwalify Archived 2021-08-12 at the Wayback Machine, Rx, built-in language type-defs)	No	No
LuaJIT Serializer from the String Buffer standard library	?	—N/a	?		Yes	?	Yes	?	Yes	?
Name	Creator-maintainer	Based on	Standardized?	Specification	Binary?	Human-readable?	Supports references?^{e}	Schema-IDL?	Standard APIs	Supports zero-copy operations

1. The current default format is binary.
2. The "classic" format is plain text, and an XML format is also supported.
3. Theoretically possible due to abstraction, but no implementation is included.
4. The primary format is binary, but text and JSON formats are available.
5. Means that generic tools/libraries know how to encode, decode, and dereference a reference to another piece of data in the same document. A tool may require the IDL file, but no more. Excludes custom, non-standardized referencing techniques.
6. ASN.1 has X.681 (Information Object System), X.682 (Constraints), and X.683 (Parameterization) that allow for the precise specification of open types where the types of values can be identified by integers, by OIDs, etc. OIDs are a standard format for globally unique identifiers, as well as a standard notation ("absolute reference") for referencing a component of a value. For example, PKIX uses such notation in RFC 5912. With such notation (constraints on parameterized types using information object sets), generic ASN.1 tools/libraries can automatically encode/decode/resolve references within a document.
7. The primary format is binary, a json encoder is available.
8. The primary format is binary, but a text format is available.

== Syntax comparison of human-readable formats ==
Format	Null	Boolean true	Boolean false	Integer	Floating-point	String	Array	Associative array/Object
ASN.1 (XML Encoding Rules)	<foo />	<foo>true</foo>	<foo>false</foo>	<foo>685230</foo>	<foo>6.8523015e+5</foo>	<foo>A to Z</foo>	<SeqOfUnrelatedDatatypes>     <isMarried>true</isMarried>     <hobby />     <velocity>-42.1e7</velocity>     <bookname>A to Z</bookname>     <bookname>We said, "no".</bookname> </SeqOfUnrelatedDatatypes>	An object (the key is a field name): <person>     <isMarried>true</isMarried>     <hobby />     <height>1.85</height>     <name>Bob Peterson</name> </person> A data mapping (the key is a data value): <competition>     <measurement>         <name>John</name>         <height>3.14</height>     </measurement>     <measurement>         <name>Jane</name>         <height>2.718</height>     </measurement> </competition>^{a}
CSV^{b}	null^{a} (or an empty element in the row)^{a}	1^{a} true^{a}	0^{a} false^{a}	685230 -685230^{a}	6.8523015e+5^{a}	A to Z "We said, ""no""."	true,,-42.1e7,"A to Z"	42,1 A to Z,1,2,3
edn	nil	true	false	685230 -685230	6.8523015e+5	"A to Z", "A \"up to\" Z"	[true nil -42.1e7 "A to Z"]	{:kw 1, "42" true, "A to Z" [1 2 3]}
Ion	null null.null null.bool null.int null.float null.decimal null.timestamp null.string null.symbol null.blob null.clob null.struct null.list null.sexp	true	false	685230 -685230; 0xA74AE; 0b111010010101110	6.8523015e5	"A to Z" '''; A to Z '''	[true, null, -42.1e7, "A to Z"]	{'42': true, 'A to Z': [1, 2, 3]}
Netstrings^{c}	0:,^{a} 4:null,^{a}	1:1,^{a} 4:true,^{a}	1:0,^{a} 5:false,^{a}	6:685230,^{a}	9:6.8523e+5,^{a}	6:A to Z,	29:4:true,0:,7:-42.1e7,6:A to Z,,	41:9:2:42,1:1,,25:6:A to Z,12:1:1,1:2,1:3,,,,^{a}
JSON	null	true	false	685230 -685230	6.8523015e+5	"A to Z"	[true, null, -42.1e7, "A to Z"]	{"42": true, "A to Z": [1, 2, 3]}
OGDL	null^{a}	true^{a}	false^{a}	685230^{a}	6.8523015e+5^{a}	"A to Z" 'A to Z'; NoSpaces	true null -42.1e7 "A to Z" (true, null, -42.1e7, "A to Z")	42   true "A to Z"   1   2   3 42   true "A to Z", (1, 2, 3)
OpenDDL	ref {null}	bool {true}	bool {false}	int32 {685230} int32 {0x74AE} int32 {0b111010010101110}	float {6.8523015e+5}	string {"A to Z"}	Homogeneous array: int32 {1, 2, 3, 4, 5} Heterogeneous array: array {     bool {true}     ref {null}     float {-42.1e7}     string {"A to Z"} }	dict {     value (key = "42") {bool {true}}     value (key = "A to Z") {int32 {1, 2, 3}} }
PHP serialization format	N;	b:1;	b:0;	i:685230; i:-685230;	d:685230.15;^{d} d:INF; d:-INF; d:NAN;	s:6:"A to Z";	a:4:{i:0;b:1;i:1;N;i:2;d:-421000000;i:3;s:6:"A to Z";}	Associative array: a:2:{i:42;b:1;s:6:"A to Z";a:3:{i:0;i:1;i:1;i:2;i:2;i:3;}} Object: O:8:"stdClass":2:{s:4:"John";d:3.14;s:4:"Jane";d:2.718;}^{d}
Pickle (Python)	N.	I01\n.	I00\n.	I685230\n.	F685230.15\n.	S'A to Z'\n.	(lI01\na(laF-421000000.0\naS'A to Z'\na.	(dI42\nI01\nsS'A to Z'\n(lI1\naI2\naI3\nas.
Property list (plain text format)	—N/a	<*BY>	<*BN>	<*I685230>	<*R6.8523015e+5>	"A to Z"	( <*BY>, <*R-42.1e7>, "A to Z" )	{     "42" = <*BY>;     "A to Z" = ( <*I1>, <*I2>, <*I3> ); }
Property list (XML format)	—N/a	<true />	<false />	<integer>685230</integer>	<real>6.8523015e+5</real>	<string>A to Z</string>	<array>     <true />     <real>-42.1e7</real>     <string>A to Z</string> </array>	<dict>     <key>42</key>     <true />     <key>A to Z</key>     <array>         <integer>1</integer>         <integer>2</integer>         <integer>3</integer>     </array> </dict>
Protocol Buffers	—N/a	true	false	685230 -685230	20.0855369	"A to Z" "sdfff2 \000\001\002\377\376\375" "q\tqq<>q2&\001\377"	field1: "value1" field1: "value2" field1: "value3 anotherfield {   foo: 123   bar: 456 } anotherfield {   foo: 222   bar: 333 }	thing1: "blahblah" thing2: 18923743 thing3: -44 thing4 {   submessage_field1: "foo"   submessage_field2: false } enumeratedThing: SomeEnumeratedValue thing5: 123.456 [extensionFieldFoo]: "etc" [extensionFieldThatIsAnEnum]: EnumValue
S-expressions	NIL nil	T #t^{f} true	NIL #f^{f} false	685230	6.8523015e+5	abc "abc" #616263# 3:abc {MzphYmM=} |YWJj|	(T NIL -42.1e7 "A to Z")	((42 T) ("A to Z" (1 2 3)))
TOML	—N/a	true	false	685230 +685_230 -685230; 0x_0A_74_AE; 0b1010_0111_0100_1010_1110	6.8523015e+5 685.230_15e+03 685_230.15 inf -inf nan	"A to Z" 'A to Z'	["y", -42.1e7, "A to Z"] [     "y",     -42.1e7,     "A to Z" ]	{ John = 3.14, Jane = 2.718 } 42 = y "A to Z" = [1, 2, 3]
YAML	~ null Null; NULL	y Y yes Yes; YES on On; ON true True; TRUE	n N no No; NO off Off; OFF false False; FALSE	685230 +685_230 -685230; 02472256; 0x_0A_74_AE; 0b1010_0111_0100_1010_1110 190:20:30	6.8523015e+5 685.230_15e+03 685_230.15; 190:20:30.15.inf -.inf.Inf.INF.NaN.nan.NAN	A to Z "A to Z" 'A to Z'	[y, ~, -42.1e7, "A to Z"] - y - - -42.1e7 - A to Z	{"John":3.14, "Jane":2.718} 42: y A to Z: [1, 2, 3]
XML^{e} and SOAP	<null />^{a}	true	false	685230	6.8523015e+5	A to Z	<item>true</item> <item xsi:nil="true"/> <item>-42.1e7</item> <item>A to Z<item>	<map>   <entry key="42">true</entry>   <entry key="A to Z">     <item val="1"/>     <item val="2"/>     <item val="3"/>   </entry> </map>
XML-RPC		<value><boolean>1</boolean></value>	<value><boolean>0</boolean></value>	<value><int>685230</int></value>	<value><double>6.8523015e+5</double></value>	<value><string>A to Z</string></value>	<value><array>   <data>   <value><boolean>1</boolean></value>   <value><double>-42.1e7</double></value>   <value><string>A to Z</string></value>   </data>   </array></value>	<value><struct>   <member>     <name>42</name>     <value><boolean>1</boolean></value>     </member>   <member>     <name>A to Z</name>     <value>       <array>         <data>           <value><int>1</int></value>           <value><int>2</int></value>           <value><int>3</int></value>           </data>         </array>       </value>     </member> </struct>

1. Omitted XML elements are commonly decoded by XML data binding tools as NULLs. Shown here is another possible encoding; XML schema does not define an encoding for this datatype.
2. The RFC CSV specification only deals with delimiters, newlines, and quote characters; it does not directly deal with serializing programming data structures.
3. The netstrings specification only deals with nested byte strings; anything else is outside the scope of the specification.
4. PHP will unserialize any floating-point number correctly, but will serialize them to their full decimal expansion. For example, 3.14 will be serialized to 3.140000000000000124344978758017532527446746826171875.
5. XML data bindings and SOAP serialization tools provide type-safe XML serialization of programming data structures into XML. Shown are XML values that can be placed in XML elements and attributes.
6. This syntax is not compatible with the Internet-Draft, but is used by some dialects of Lisp.

== Comparison of binary formats ==
Format	Null	Booleans	Integer	Floating-point	String	Array	Associative array/object
ASN.1 (BER, PER or OER encoding)	NULL type	BOOLEAN: BER: as 1 byte in binary form; PER: as 1 bit; OER: as 1 byte	INTEGER: BER: variable-length big-endian binary representation (up to 2^{2^{1024}} bits); PER Unaligned: a fixed number of bits if the integer type has a finite range; a variable number of bits otherwise; PER Aligned: a fixed number of bits if the integer type has a finite range and the size of the range is less than 65536; a variable number of octets otherwise; OER: 1, 2, or 4 octets (either signed or unsigned) if the integer type has a finite range that fits in that number of octets; a variable number of octets otherwise	REAL: base-10 real values are represented as character strings in ISO 6093 format; binary real values are represented in a binary format that includes the mantissa, the base (2, 8, or 16), and the exponent; the special values NaN, -INF, +INF, and negative zero are also supported	Multiple valid types (VisibleString, PrintableString, GeneralString, UniversalString, UTF8String)	Data specifications SET OF (unordered) and SEQUENCE OF (guaranteed order)	User definable type
BSON	\x0A (1 byte)	True: \x08\x01 False: \x08\x00 (2 bytes)	int32: 32-bit little-endian 2's complement or int64: 64-bit little-endian 2's complement	Double: little-endian binary64	UTF-8-encoded, preceded by int32-encoded string length in bytes	BSON embedded document with numeric keys	BSON embedded document
Concise Binary Object Representation (CBOR)	\xf6 (1 byte)	True: \xf5; False: \xf4; (1 byte)	Small positive/negative \x00–\x17 & \x20–\x37 (1 byte); 8-bit: positive \x18, negative \x38 (+ 1 byte); 16-bit: positive \x19, negative \x39 (+ 2 bytes); 32-bit: positive \x1A, negative \x3A (+ 4 bytes); 64-bit: positive \x1B, negative \x3B (+ 8 bytes); Negative x encoded as (−x − 1)	IEEE half/single/double \xf9–\xfb (+ 2–8 bytes); Decimals and bigfloats (4+ bytes) encoded as \xc4 tag + 2-item array of integer mantissa & exponent	Length and content (1–9 bytes overhead); Bytestring \x40–\x5f; UTF-8 \x60–\x7f; Indefinite partial strings \x5f and \x7f stitched together until \xff.	Length and items \x80–\x9e; Indefinite list \x9f terminated by \xff entry.	Length (in pairs) and items \xa0–\xbe; Indefinite map \xbf terminated by \xff key.
Efficient XML Interchange (EXI) (Note: Any XML based representation can be compressed, or generated as, using EXI – "Efficient XML Interchange (EXI) Format 1.0 (Second Edition)". – which is a "Schema Informed" (as opposed to schema-required, or schema-less) binary compression standard for XML.) (Unpreserved lexical values format)	xsi:nil is not allowed in binary context.	1–2 bit integer interpreted as boolean.	Boolean sign, plus arbitrary length 7-bit octets, parsed until most-significant bit is 0, in little-endian. The schema can set the zero-point to any arbitrary number. Unsigned skips the boolean flag.	Float: integer mantissa and integer exponent.; Decimal: boolean sign, integer whole value, integer fractional.	Length prefixed integer-encoded Unicode. Integers may represent enumerations or string table entries instead.	Length prefixed set of items.	Not in protocol.
FlatBuffers	Encoded as absence of field in parent object	True: \x01; False: \x00; (1 byte)	Little-endian 2's complement signed and unsigned 8/16/32/64 bits	Floats: little-endian binary32; Doubles: little-endian binary64	UTF-8-encoded, preceded by 32-bit integer length of string in bytes	Vectors of any other type, preceded by 32-bit integer length of number of elements	Tables (schema defined types) or Vectors sorted by key (maps / dictionaries)
Ion	\x0f (Note: All basic Ion types have a null variant, as its 0xXf tag. Any tag beginning with 0x0X other than 0x0f defines ignored padding.)	True: \x11; False: \x10	Positive \x2x, negative \x3x; Zero is always encoded in tag byte.; BigInts over 13 bytes (104 bits) have 1+ byte overhead for length	\x44 (32-bit float); \x48 (64-bit float); Zero is always encoded in tag byte.	UTF-8: \x8x; Other strings: \x9x; Arbitrary length and overhead	\xbx Arbitrary length and overhead. Length in octets.	Structs (numbered fields): \xdx; Annotations (named fields): \xex
MessagePack	\xc0	True: \xc3; False: \xc2	Single byte "fixnum" (values −32 – 127); or typecode (1 byte) + big-endian (u)int8/16/32/64	Typecode (1 byte) + IEEE single/double	Typecode + up to 15 bytes; or typecode + length as uint8/16/32 + bytes; encoding is unspecified	As "fixarray" (single-byte prefix + up to 15 array items); or typecode (1 byte) + 2–4 bytes length + array items	As "fixmap" (single-byte prefix + up to 15 key-value pairs); or typecode (1 byte) + 2–4 bytes length + key-value pairs
Netstrings (Note: Interpretation of Netstrings is entirely application- or schema-dependent.)	Not in protocol.	Not in protocol.	Not in protocol.	Not in protocol.	Length-encoded as an ASCII string + ':' + data + ',' Length counts only octets between ':' and ','	Not in protocol.	Not in protocol.
OGDL Binary							
Property list (binary format)							
Protocol Buffers			Variable encoding length signed 32-bit: varint encoding of "ZigZag"-encoded value (n << 1) XOR (n >> 31); Variable encoding length signed 64-bit: varint encoding of "ZigZag"-encoded (n << 1) XOR (n >> 63); Constant encoding length 32-bit: 32 bits in little-endian 2's complement; Constant encoding length 64-bit: 64 bits in little-endian 2's complement	Floats: little-endian binary32; Doubles: little-endian binary64	UTF-8-encoded, preceded by varint-encoded integer length of string in bytes	Repeated value with the same tag or, for varint-encoded integers only, values packed contiguously and prefixed by tag and total byte length	—N/a
Smile	\x21	True: \x23; False: \x22	Single byte "small" (values −16 – 15 encoded as \xc0–\xdf), zigzag-encoded varints (1–11 data bytes), or BigInteger	IEEE single/double, BigDecimal	Length-prefixed "short" Strings (up to 64 bytes), marker-terminated "long" Strings and (optional) back-references	Arbitrary-length heterogenous arrays with end-marker	Arbitrary-length key/value pairs with end-marker
Structured Data eXchange Formats (SDXF)			Big-endian signed 24-bit or 32-bit integer	Big-endian IEEE double	Either UTF-8 or ISO 8859-1 encoded	List of elements with identical ID and size, preceded by array header with int16 length	Chunks can contain other chunks to arbitrary depth.
Thrift							
LuaJIT Serializer from the String Buffer standard library	0x00 for Lua Nil, 0x03 for Null lightuserdata	0x01 and 0x02 for false and true respectively	Little endian. 0x06 for int32, 0x10 and 0x11 for int64 and uint64 respectively. 0x12 for complex integers of 2 int64s	0x07 for double-precision floating point numbers.	Available	Available	Available

== See also ==
- Comparison of document markup languages
