= Etch (protocol) =

Framework for building network services

Apache Etch
- Developer: Apache Software Foundation
- Stable release: 1.4.0 / August 6, 2014; 11 years ago
- Type: remote procedure call framework
- License: Apache License 2.0
- Website: etch.apache.org
- Repository: svn.apache.org/repos/asf/etch

Etch was an open-source, cross-platform framework for building network services, first announced in May 2008 by Cisco Systems. Etch encompasses a service description language, a compiler, and a number of language bindings. It is intended to supplement SOAP and CORBA as methods of communicating between networked pieces of software, especially where there is an emphasis on portability, transport independence, small size, and high performance. Etch was designed to be incorporated into existing applications and systems, enabling a transition to a service-oriented architecture. It was derived from work on the Cisco Unified Application Environment, the product acquired by Cisco as part of the Metreos acquisition.

== History ==
The mid-2008 release was planned to supported Java and C#. A second wave of support was supposed to include Ruby, Python, JavaScript, and C.

In July 2008, Etch was released under the Apache 2.0 license.

As part of the open source process, Etch was submitted to the Apache Incubator to be accepted as a new podling. On August 25, 2008, the formal vote was proposed and was eventually passed. In September 2008 Etch entered the start-up phase within the Apache Incubator.

Cisco announced the Unified Application Environment had its "end of life" on February 8, 2012.

In January 2013, Etch has become an Apache top-level project.

Etch was marked as a "retired" project in December 2016. No replacement project has been announced or specified.

== See also ==
- Google's Protocol Buffers
- Apache Thrift
- ZeroC's Internet Communications Engine (ICE)
