= Serde =

Serde may refer to:

- Serde, Tibet
- Serialization and deserialization, in computing
