= OGDL =

OGDL (Ordered Graph Data Language), is a "structured textual format that represents information in the form of graphs, where the nodes are strings and the arcs or edges are spaces or indentation."

Like XML, but unlike JSON and YAML, OGDL includes a schema notation and path traversal notation. There is also a binary representation.

== Example ==
network
  eth0
    ip   192.168.0.10
    mask 255.255.255.0

hostname crispin

== See also ==
- Comparison of data serialization formats
