= Swizzling =

Swizzling may refer to:

- Pointer swizzling – a computer science term.
- Swizzling (computer graphics) – a computer graphics term.
- Method swizzling
- Texture swizzling – in computer graphics, a way to store texture maps while respecting locality of reference.
