= Ganglia (software) =

Distributed monitoring tool software

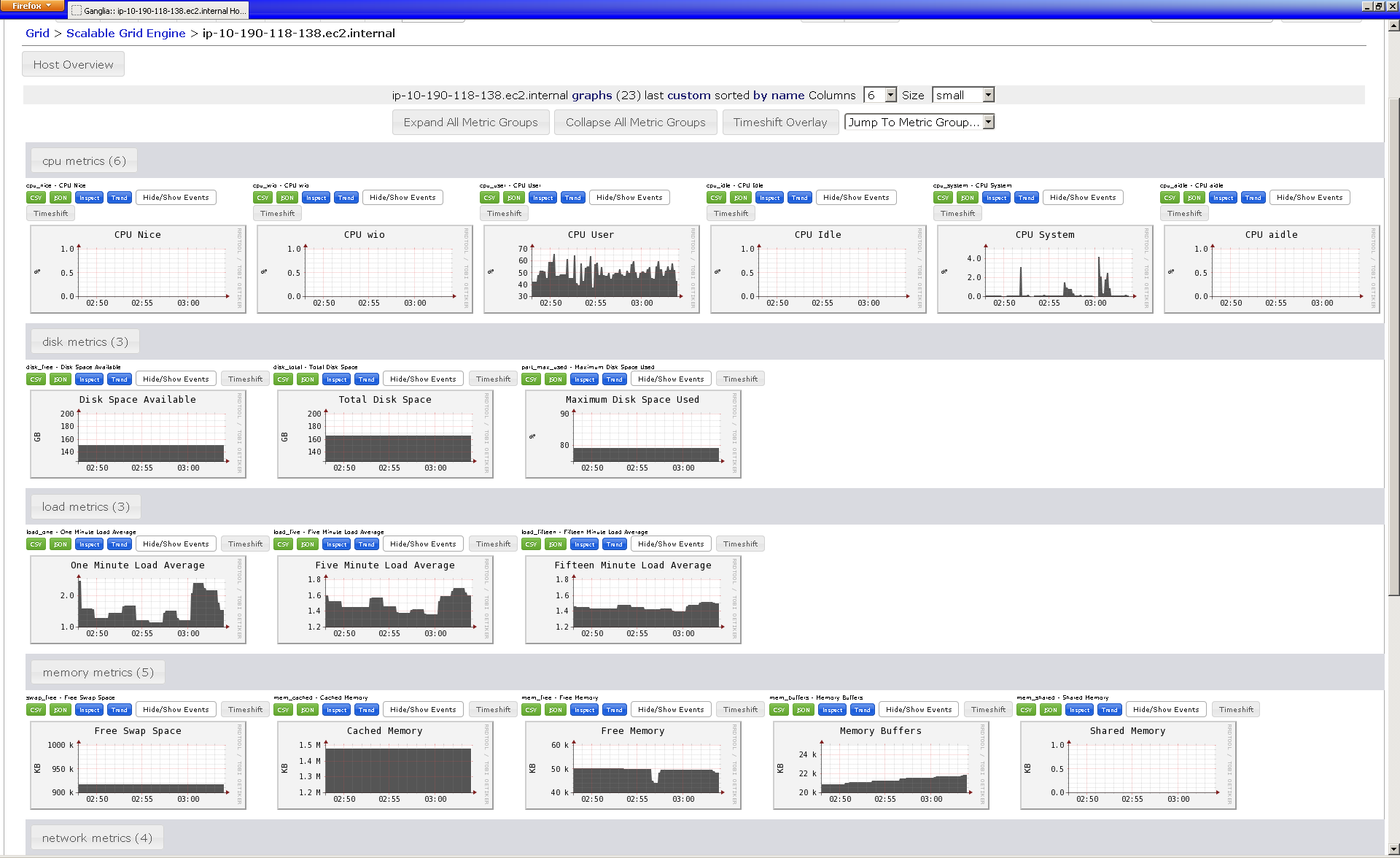
- Screenshot
- Stable release: 3.7.6 / 21 February 2024; 2 years ago
- Written in: C, Perl, PHP, Python
- Operating system: Cross-platform
- Available in: English
- Type: Distributed monitoring
- License: BSD
- Website: www.ganglia.info

Ganglia is a scalable, distributed system monitoring tool for high-performance computing systems, clusters and networks. The software is used to view either live or recorded statistics covering metrics such as central processing unit (CPU) load averages or network utilization for many nodes.

Ganglia software is bundled with enterprise-level Linux distributions such as Red Hat Enterprise Linux (RHEL) or the CentOS repackaging of the same. Ganglia grew out of requirements for monitoring systems by the University of California, Berkeley but now is used by commercial and educational organisations such as Cray, Massachusetts Institute of Technology (MIT), NASA, and Twitter.

== Design ==
It is based on a hierarchical design targeted at federations of clusters. It relies on a multicast-based listen/announce protocol to monitor state within clusters and uses a tree of point-to-point connections amongst representative cluster nodes to federate clusters and aggregate their state. It leverages widely used technologies such as XML for data representation, External Data Representation (XDR) for compact, portable data transport, and RRDtool for data storage and visualization. It uses carefully engineered data structures and algorithms to achieve very low per-node overheads and high concurrency. The implementation is robust, has been ported to an extensive set of operating systems and processor architectures, and is currently in use on over 500 clusters around the world. It has been used to link clusters across university campuses and around the world and can scale to handle clusters with 2000 nodes.

The ganglia system comprises two unique daemons: a PHP-based web front-end, and a few other small utility software programs.

=== Ganglia Monitoring Daemon (gmond) ===
Gmond is a multi-threaded daemon which runs on each cluster node you want to monitor. Installation does not require having a common NFS filesystem or a database back-end, installing special accounts or maintaining configuration files.

Gmond has four main responsibilities:

1. Monitor changes in host state.
2. Announce relevant changes.
3. Listen to the state of all other ganglia nodes via a unicast or multicast channel.
4. Answer requests for an XML description of the cluster state.

Each gmond transmits information in two different ways:

- Unicasting or Multicasting host state in external data representation (XDR) format using UDP messages.
- Sending XML over a TCP connection.

=== Ganglia Meta Daemon (gmetad) ===
Federation in Ganglia is achieved using a tree of point-to-point connections amongst representative cluster nodes to aggregate the state of multiple clusters. At each node in the tree, a Ganglia Meta Daemon (gmetad) periodically polls a collection of child data sources, parses the collected XML, saves all numeric, volatile metrics to round-robin databases and exports the aggregated XML over a TCP socket to clients. Data sources may be either gmond daemons, representing specific clusters, or other gmetad daemons, representing sets of clusters. Data sources use source IP addresses for access control and can be specified using multiple IP addresses for failover. The latter ability is natural for aggregating data from clusters since each gmond daemon contains the entire state of its cluster.

=== Ganglia PHP Web front-end ===
The Ganglia web front-end provides a view of the gathered information via real-time dynamic web pages. Most importantly, it displays Ganglia data in a meaningful way for system administrators and computer users. Although the web front-end to Ganglia began as a simple HTML view of the XML tree, it has evolved into a system that keeps a colorful history of all collected data.

The Ganglia web front-end caters to system administrators and users. For example, one can view the CPU utilization over the past hour, day, week, month, or year. The web front-end shows similar graphs for memory usage, disk usage, network statistics, number of running processes, and all other Ganglia metrics.

The web front-end depends on the existence of the gmetad, which provides data from several Ganglia sources. Specifically, the web front-end will open the local port 8651 (by default) and expects to receive a Ganglia XML tree. The web pages themselves are highly dynamic. Any change to the Ganglia data appears immediately on the site. This behavior leads to a very responsive site, but requires that the full XML tree be parsed on every page access.

The Ganglia web front-end is written in PHP, and uses graphs generated by gmetad to display history information. It has been tested on many flavours of Unix (mostly Linux) with the Apache webserver and the PHP5 module.
