= PHP serialization format =

The PHP serialization format is the serialization format used by the PHP programming language. The format can serialize PHP's primitive and compound types, and also properly serializes references. The format was first introduced in PHP 4.

In addition to PHP, the format is also used by some third-party applications that are often integrated with PHP applications, for example by Lucene/Solr.

== Syntax ==
The syntax generally follows the pattern of one-letter code of the variable type, followed by a colon and the length of the data, followed by the variable value, and ending with a semicolon. For the associative array, the format is <serialised key> ; <serialised value>, repeated for each association/pair in the array.

Type	Serialization examples
Null	N;
Boolean	b:1; b:0;
Integer	i:685230; i:-685230;
Floating point	d:685230.15; d:INF; d:-INF; d:NAN;
String	s:5:"apple"; s:6:"A to Z";
Associative array	a:4:{i:0;b:1;i:1;N;i:2;d:-421000000;i:3;s:6:"A to Z";} a:2:{i:42;b:1;s:6:"A to Z";a:3:{i:0;i:1;i:1;i:2;i:2;i:3;}}
Object	O:8:"stdClass":2:{s:4:"John";d:3.14;s:4:"Jane";d:2.718;}
Reference	a:2:{i:0;s:3:"foo";i:1;R:2;}
