= External Data Representation =

Standart data serialization format

External Data Representation (XDR) is a technical standard format for data serialization, for uses such as computer network protocols. It allows data to be transferred between different kinds of computer systems. Converting from the local representation to XDR is called encoding. Converting from XDR to the local representation is called decoding. XDR is implemented as a software library of functions which is portable between different operating systems and is also independent of the transport layer.

XDR uses a base unit of 4 bytes, 32 bits, serialized in big-endian order; smaller data types still occupy four bytes each after encoding. Variable-length types such as string and opaque are padded to a total divisible by four bytes. Floating-point numbers are represented in IEEE 754 format.

== History ==
XDR was developed in the mid 1980s at Sun Microsystems, and first widely published in 1987. XDR became an Internet Engineering Task Force (IETF) Internet Standard in 1995.

The XDR data format is in use by many systems, including:

- Network File System protocol
- ZFS, former Zettabyte File System
- Network Data Management Protocol (NDMP)
- Open Network Computing Remote Procedure Call (Sun RPC)
- EMC NetWorker, former Legato NetWorker, backup software, sold later by EMC
- NetCDF, a scientific data format
- The R language and environment for statistical computing
- The HTTP-NG binary wire protocol
- The SpiderMonkey JavaScript engine, to serialize/deserialize compiled JavaScript code
- The Ganglia distributed monitoring system
- The sFlow network monitoring standard
- The libvirt virtualization library, application programming interface (API) and user interface (UI)
- The Firebird (database server) for remote binary wire protocol
- Stellar payment network

== XDR data types ==
- boolean
- int – 32-bit integer
- unsigned int – unsigned 32-bit integer
- hyper – 64-bit integer
- unsigned hyper – unsigned 64-bit integer
- IEEE float
- IEEE double
- quadruple – new in RFC1832
- enumeration
- structure
- string
- fixed length array
- variable length array
- union – discriminated union
- fixed length opaque data
- variable length opaque data
- void – zero byte quantity
- optional – optional data is notated similarly to C pointers, but is represented as the data type "pointed to" with a Boolean "present or not" flag. Semantically this is option type.

== See also ==
- Structured Data eXchange Format (SDXF)
- Remote procedure call
- Abstract Syntax Notation One (ASN.1)
- Data Format Description Language
- Comparison of data-serialization formats
