= Metreos =

Metreos Corporation
- Type: Subsidiary
- Industry: Computer software, Internet telephony
- Founded: Austin, Texas (January 2001)
- Founder: Louis Marascio; Mark Richards
- Headquarters: Austin, Texas, United States
- Key people: Joel Fontenot (CEO); Louis Marascio (Founder CTO); Adam Takvam (Chief Architect); David Wilson (VP Marketing); Ben Alves (VP Sales); Vaughan Stanford (Dir Business Development)
- Parent: Cisco Systems

Metreos was a software company that created and sold development and runtime tools for creating voice over Internet Protocol software applications. The company was founded by Louis Marascio and Mark Richards and was based in Austin, Texas, United States. On June 8, 2006 Cisco Systems announced it was acquiring Metreos for $28 million in cash. On June 30, 2006, the acquisition of Metreos by Cisco Systems was completed.

== Funding ==
Metreos completed two rounds of financing: a $550,000 seed round from Startech Early Ventures, in the form of convertible debt, that was completed in March 2003; and a $3.8 million Series A equity financing led by Hunt Ventures and Gefinor Ventures completed in October 2004.

== Products and business ==
Metreos developed a number of VoIP applications, such as click-to-talk and speech recognition, as well as a VoIP application development platform enabling developers to create and manage their own IP telephony applications. The company was an existing Cisco partner prior to its acquisition and, at the time of the deal, had 19 employees.

== Acquisition by Cisco ==
Metreos was acquired by Cisco Systems alongside New York–based Audium Corp.,a provider of VoiceXML speech self-service application development environments, in two separate deals totaling $47.8 million in cash:approximately $28 million for Metreos and $19.8 million for Audium. Cisco said the acquisitions would strengthen its Unified Communications system and its Service Oriented Network Architecture (SONA) strategy, and that both companies' products and staff would become part of its Voice Technology Group, led by senior vice president Don Proctor. Cisco said the deals were expected to close by the end of its fiscal year on July 29, 2006.
