= Ion (serialization format) =

Data serialization format developed by Amazon

- Filename extension: .ion
- Internet media type: application/ion
- Developed by: Amazon
- Type of format: Data interchange
- Website: amzn.github.io/ion-docs/

Ion is a data serialization language developed by Amazon. It may be represented by either a human-readable text form or a compact binary form. The text form is a superset of JSON; thus, any valid JSON document is also a valid Ion document.

== Data types ==
As a superset of JSON, Ion includes the following data types

- null: An empty value (for JSON compatibility)
- bool: Boolean values
- string: Unicode text literals
- list: Ordered heterogeneous collection of Ion values (extension of JSON array)
- struct: Unordered collection of key/value pairs (extension of JSON object)

The nebulous JSON 'number' type is strictly defined in Ion to be one of

- int: Signed integers of arbitrary size
- float: 64-bit IEEE binary-encoded floating point numbers
- decimal: Decimal-encoded real numbers of arbitrary precision

Ion adds these types:

- timestamp: Date/time/time zone moments of arbitrary precision
- symbol: Unicode symbolic atoms (a.k.a. identifiers), stored as interned strings in binary format
- blob: Binary data of user-defined encoding
- clob: Text data of user-defined encoding
- sexp: Nested list of values (equivalent to an S-expression) with application-defined semantics

Each Ion type supports a null variant, indicating a lack of value while maintaining a strict type (e.g., null.int, null.struct).

The Ion format permits attaching one or more annotations (i.e. a list of symbols) to any value. Such annotations may be used as metadata for otherwise opaque data (such as a blob).

== Implementations ==
- Amazon supported library implementations
- C#
- Go Lang
- Python
- JS

== Examples ==
=== Sample document ===
Features seen in JavaScript and JSON5:

// Comments are allowed using the double forward slash 
{
  key: "value",   // key here is a symbol, it can also be a string as in JSON
  nums: 1_000_000, // equivalent to 1000000, use of underscores with numbers is more readable
  "A float": 31415e-4,  // key is a value that contains spaces 
}

Features unique to Ion:

{
  symbol: 'a symbol',     // symbols are interned Unicode strings
  "A null integer": null.int,
  annotated: age::35,     // the symbol "age" is attached to the value "35" as an annotation
  lists : 'hw grades'::[80, 85, 90], // any symbol can be used as an annotation 
  many_annot: I::have::many::annotations::true, // annotations are not nested, but rather, a list of annotations
  sexp: (this (is a [valid] "Ion") last::value + 42) // Ion S-expressions. 'this', 'is', 'a', 'valid', 'value', and '+' are symbols.
  _value: {{OiBTIKUgTyAASb8=}}, // blob value is represented as base64
  _value: {{"a b\0\xff"}}             // clob value is represented as an ASCII string with C-style escapes
  // ^ repeated names (keys) are allowed but generate a warning for undefined behavior 
}

=== Uses ===
- Amazon's Quantum Ledger Database (QLDB) stores data in Ion documents.
- PartiQL, an open source SQL-based query language also by Amazon, is built upon Ion. PartiQL supported queries are used by QLDB, S3Select.

== Tooling and extensions ==
- Ion Path Extractor API aims to combine the convenience of a DOM API with the speed of a streaming API.
- IDE support
  - Eclipse
  - IntelliJ
- Jackson data format module for Ion
- Apache Hive SerDe for Ion
- Ion Schema
  - Specification
  - Implementations
- Ion Hash defines an algorithm for constructing a hash for any Ion value, given a user-provided hash function capable of taking binary data of arbitrary length.
  - Specification
  - Implementations
