= XPointer =

System for addressing components of XML-based Internet media

- XPointer Framework
- Native name: XPointer Framework
- Status: W3C Recommendation
- Year started: 1997; 28 years ago
- First published: April 6, 1997; 28 years ago
- Latest version: XPointer Framework Recommendation; March 25, 2003; 22 years ago
- Organization: W3C
- Committee: W3C XML Linking Working Group
- Editors: Paul Grosso; Eve Maler; Jonathan Marsh; Norman Walsh
- Base standards: XML, XPath
- Website: www.w3.org/TR/xptr-framework/

XPointer is a system for addressing components of XML-based Internet media. It is divided among four specifications: a "framework" that forms the basis for identifying XML fragments, a positional element addressing scheme, a scheme for namespaces, and a scheme for XPath-based addressing. XPointer Framework is a W3C recommendation since March 2003.

The XPointer language is designed to address structural aspects of XML, including text content and other information objects created as a result of parsing the document. Thus, it could be used to point to a section of a document highlighted by a user through a mouse drag action.

During development, and until 2016, XPointer was covered by a royalty-free technology patent held by Sun Microsystems.

== Positional element addressing ==
The element() scheme introduces positional addressing of child elements. This is similar to a simple XPath address, but subsequent steps can only be numbers representing the position of a descendant relative to its branch on the tree.

For instance, given the following fragment:

<foobar id="foo">
  <bar/>
  <baz>
    <bom a="1"/>
  </baz>
  <bom a="2"/>
</foobar>

results as the following examples:

 xpointer(id("foo")) => foobar
 xpointer(/foobar/1) => bar
 xpointer(//bom) => bom (a=1), bom (a=2)
 element(/1/2/1) => bom (a=1) (/1 descend into first element (foobar),
                               /2 descend into second child element (baz),
                               /1 select first child element (bom))

== See also ==
- URI fragment
- HTML
- HyTime
- Text Encoding Initiative Guidelines
- XML
