= Self-documenting code =

Source code written to enable use by others without prior experience

In computer programming, self-documenting (or self-describing) source code and user interfaces follow naming conventions and structured programming conventions that enable use of the system without prior specific knowledge.

== Objectives ==
Commonly stated objectives for self-documenting systems include:

- Make source code easier to read and understand
- Minimize the effort required to maintain or extend legacy systems
- Reduce the need for users and developers of a system to consult secondary documentation sources such as code comments or software manuals
- Facilitate automation through self-contained knowledge representation

== Conventions ==
Self-documenting code is ostensibly written using human-readable names, typically consisting of a phrase in a human language which reflects the symbol's meaning, such as article.numberOfWords() or tryOpen(). The code must also have a clear and clean structure so that a human reader can easily understand the algorithm used.

== Practical considerations ==
There are certain practical considerations that influence whether and how well the objectives for a self-documenting system can be realized.

- uniformity of naming conventions
- consistency
- scope of the application and system requirements

== Examples ==
Below is a very simple example of self-documenting C# code, using naming conventions in place of explicit comments to make the logic of the code more obvious to human readers.

using System;

int CountAlphanumericChars(string s)
{
    int count = 0;

    foreach (char ch in s)
    {
        if (Char.IsLetterOrDigit(c))
        {
            ++count;
        }
    }
    return count;
}

== Criticism ==
Jef Raskin criticized the belief in "self-documenting" code by saying that code cannot explain the rationale behind why the program is being written or why it is implemented in such a way.

== See also ==
- Autological word
- Code readability
- Comment (computer programming)
- Controlled natural language
- Literate programming
- Natural language programming
