= Shard (database architecture) =

Horizontal partition of data in a database or search engine

A database shard, or simply a shard, is a horizontal partition of data within a database or search engine. Each shard may be held on a separate database server instance in order to spread across multiple servers.

Some data in a database may remain present in all shards, (Note: Typically supporting data such as dimension tables.) while other data is stored in only one shard. In such cases, each shard acts as the single source for its subset of data.

== Database architecture ==
Horizontal partitioning is a database design principle whereby rows of a database table are held separately, rather than being split into columns (as in normalization and vertical partitioning, to varying degrees). Each partition forms part of a shard, which may in turn be located on a separate database server or in a separate physical location.

There are numerous advantages to the horizontal partitioning of data. Since tables are divided and distributed into multiple servers, the total number of rows in each table in each database is reduced. This reduces index size, which generally improves search performance. A database shard can be placed on separate hardware, and multiple shards can be placed on multiple machines. This enables the distribution of a database across a large number of machines, which can significantly improve performance. In addition, if the database shard is based on some real-world segmentation of the data (e.g., European customers v. American customers) it may be possible to infer the appropriate shard membership easily and automatically, and to query only the relevant shard.

In practice, sharding is complex. Although it has long been implemented through manual coding (especially where rows have an obvious grouping, as in the customer region example above), this approach is often inflexible. There is a desire to support sharding automatically, both in terms of adding code support for it, and for identifying candidates to be sharded separately. Consistent hashing is a technique used in sharding to distribute large loads across multiple smaller services and servers.

Where distributed computing is used to separate load between multiple servers (either for performance or reliability reasons), a sharding approach may also be useful. In the 2010s, sharding of execution capacity, as well as the more traditional sharding of data, emerged as a potential approach to address performance and scalability challenges in blockchains.

Recent academic work has proposed protocols such as Cerberus to address cross-shard atomicity by braiding consensus across multiple shards, allowing transactions to affect multiple partitions simultaneously without requiring a global lock.

== Compared to horizontal partitioning ==
Horizontal partitioning splits one or more tables by row, usually within a single instance of a schema and a database server. It may offer an advantage by reducing index size (and thus search effort), provided there is an obvious, robust, and implicit way to identify in which partition a particular row will be found, without having to first search the index; for example, the classic case of the 'CustomersEast' and 'CustomersWest' tables, where a ZIP code already indicates where a row will be found.

Sharding extends this approach. It partitions the relevant table or tables in the same way, but does so across potentially multiple instances of the schema. An advantage is that the search load for the large partitioned table can be distributed across multiple servers (logical or physical), rather than only across multiple indexes on a same logical server.

Splitting shards across multiple isolated instances requires more than simple horizontal partitioning. The expected gains in efficiency would be reduced if querying the database required multiple instances to be accessed just to retrieve a simple dimension table. Beyond partitioning, sharding therefore involves distributing large, partitionable tables across servers, while smaller tables are replicated in full on each server.

This is also why sharding is related to a shared-nothing architecture—once sharded, each shard can reside in a separate logical schema instance, physical database server, data center, or geographic region. Sharding is intended to minimize the need for cross-shard access by partitioning data across independent shards.

This makes replication across multiple servers easier (simple horizontal partitioning does not). It is also useful for worldwide distribution of applications, where communications links between data centers might otherwise become a bottleneck.

There is also a requirement for some notification and replication mechanism between schema instances, so that unpartitioned tables remain as closely synchronized as the application requires. This is a complex architectural choice in sharded systems: approaches range from making these tables effectively read-only (with updates that are rare and batched), to dynamically replicated tables (at the cost of reducing some of the distribution benefits of sharding), and many options in between.

== Implementations ==
- Altibase provides a combined (client-side and server-side) sharding architecture transparent to client applications.
- Apache HBase supports automatic sharding.
- Azure SQL Database Elastic Database tools support support sharding to enable scaling out and in of an application’s data tier.
- ClickHouse, an open-source OLAP database management system, supports sharding.
- Couchbase supports automatic and transparent sharding.
- CUBRID has supported sharding since version 9.0.
- Db2 Data Partitioning Feature (MPP), a shared-nothing database partitioning feature, runs on separate nodes.
- DRDS (Distributed Relational Database Service) of Alibaba Cloud supports database and table sharding, and has been used for large-scale events such as Singles' Day.
- Elasticsearch, an enterprise search server, supports sharding.
- eXtreme Scale is a cross-process in-memory key/value data store (a NoSQL data store) that uses sharding to achieve scalability across processes for both data and MapReduce-style parallel processing.
- Hibernate supports sharding, but has seen little development since 2007.
- IBM Informix has supported sharding since version 12.1 xC1 as part of the MACH11 technology. Informix 12.10 xC2 added full compatibility with MongoDB drivers, allowing a mix of regular relational tables and NoSQL collections while retaining sharding, fail-over, and ACID properties.
- Kdb+ has supported sharding since version 2.0.
- MariaDB Spider, a storage engine, supports table federation, sharding, XA transactions, and ODBC data sources. It has been included in MariaDB server since version 10.0.4.
- MonetDB, an open-source column-store, introduced read-only sharding in its July 2015 release.
- MongoDB has supported sharding since version 1.6.
- MySQL Cluster supports automatic and transparent sharding across commodity nodes, allowing scaling of read and write queries, without requiring application changes.
- MySQL Fabric (part of MySQL utilities) supports sharding.
- Oracle Database shards since 12c Release 2 and in one liner: Combination of sharding advantages with well-known capabilities of enterprise ready multi-model Oracle Database.
- Oracle NoSQL Database supports automatic sharding and elastic, online expansion of clusters.
- OrientDB has supported sharding since version 1.7.
- Solr, an enterprise search platform, supports sharding.
- ScyllaDB uses per-core sharding within a server and across all nodes in a cluster.
- Spanner, a distributed database developed by Google, shards across multiple Paxos state machines to scale to large numbers of machines, data centers, and rows.
- SQLAlchemy ORM, a data-mapper for the Python programming language shards.
- SQL Server has supported sharding since SQL Server 2005 with the use of 3rd party tools.
- Teradata markets a massive parallel database management system as a data warehouse.
- Vault, a cryptocurrency design, uses sharding to reduce the data required to join the network and verify transactions, improving scalability.
- Vitess, an open-source database clustering system, supports sharding for MySQL and is a Cloud Native Computing Foundation project.
- ShardingSphere is a database clustering system that provides data sharding, distributed transactions, and distributed database management, and is an Apache Software Foundation (ASF) project.

== Disadvantages ==
Sharding a database table before it has been optimized locally can introduce unnecessary complexity. Sharding is generally recommended when other optimization strategies have proven insufficient. The added complexity of database sharding can result in several potential challenges.

- SQL complexity: Developers may need to write more complex SQL queries to handle sharding logic
- Additional software requirements: Software that partitions, balances, coordinates, and maintains data integrity can fail or introduce errors.
- Single point of failure: Corruption or failure of one shard due to network, hardware, or system issues can affect the integrity of the entire dataset.
- Fail-over server complexity: Fail-over servers must maintain copies of all database shards.
- Backups complexity: Database backups of the individual shards must be coordinated with the backups of the other shards.
- Operational complexity: Tasks such as adding or removing indexes, modifying columns, or altering the schema become more difficult in a sharded environment.

== Etymology ==
In a database context, the term "shard" has two independent points of origin. One is Computer Corporation of America's "SHARD" (System for Highly Available Replicated Data), a distributed database architecture in which every node holds a full replica of the database rather than a distinct partition of it. Despite the name, this system is unrelated to horizontal partitioning as the term is used today.

The other is the 1997 MMORPG Ultima Online. Richard Garriott, creator of Ultima Online, recalled that the term originated during the production of the game, specifically in creating a self-regulating, virtual ecology system. Players were able to interact and harvest in-game resources, which disrupted the balance of the system. To address this, the development team divided the player base across multiple parallel copies of the game world, and introduced a fictional justification tied to the end of Ultima I: The First Age of Darkness, where the defeat of its antagonist Mondain also led to the creation of multiverse "shards." This gave Garriott's team the in-universe rationale for running multiple copies of the environment. It remains a core part of Ultima Online's architecture, with dozens of shards still active.

== See also ==
- Block Range Index
- Shared-nothing architecture
