= Smile (data interchange format) =

Computer data interchange format based on JSON

- Filename extension: .sml
- Internet media type: application/x-jackson-smile (proposed)
- Magic number: 3a 29 0a ":)\n"
- Initial release: September 12, 2010; 16 years ago
- Latest release: 1.0.7; August 26, 2025; 14 months ago
- Type of format: Data interchange
- Extended from: JSON
- Standard: no RFC yet
- Website: github.com/FasterXML/smile-format-specification

Smile is a computer data interchange format based on JSON. It can also be considered a binary serialization of the generic JSON data model, which means tools that operate on JSON may be used with Smile as well, as long as a proper encoder/decoder exists for the tool. The name comes from the first 2 bytes of the 4 byte header, which consist of Smiley ":)" followed by a linefeed: a choice made to make it easier to recognize Smile-encoded data files using textual command-line tools.

== Efficiency ==
Compared to JSON, Smile is both more compact and more efficient to process (both to read and write). Part of this is due to more efficient binary encoding (similar to BSON, CBOR and UBJSON), but an additional feature is optional use of back references for property names and values. Back referencing allows replacing of property names and/or short (64 bytes or less) String values with 1- or 2-byte reference ids.

== Implementations ==
Libraries known to support Smile include:

- Cheshire (Clojure) is a data encoding library that supports Smile as binary alternative to JSON
- Jackson (Java) with Binary dataformat module supporting Smile, Avro, CBOR, Ion and Protocol Buffers
- libsmile (C/C++; wrappers for Ruby, Perl)
- smile_ex for beam languages, Erlang, Elixir, and Gleam
- go-smile for decoding Smile data in Golang
- Protostuff (Java) supports multiple data formats for serialization, including Smile, JSON, XML and Protocol Buffers.
- PySmile for encoding/decoding Smile data in Python
- NewSmile for encoding/decoding Smile data in Python >= 3.7
- smile-js for decoding Smile data from JavaScript
- serde_smile for encoding/decoding data from Rust

== Usage ==
- Elasticsearch supports Smile with its APIs

== See also ==
- JSON
- BSON
- CBOR
- UBJSON
- Comparison of data serialization formats
