= SQL Server =

SQL Server may refer to:

- Microsoft SQL Server, a relational database server from Microsoft
- Sybase SQL Server, a relational database server developed by Sybase

== See also ==
- SQL
