= Universally unique identifier =

128-bit number used to identify information in computer systems

- Acronym: UUID
- Organisation: Open Software Foundation (OSF), ISO/IEC, Internet Engineering Task Force (IETF)
- No. of digits: 32
- Example: 8be4df61-93ca-11d2-aa0d-00e098032b8c
- Website: RFC 9562 (obsoleted RFC 4122)

A universally unique identifier (UUID) is a 128-bit number used to identify information in computer systems. The term globally unique identifier (GUID) is also used, typically in software created by Microsoft.

When generated according to the standards, UUIDs are, for practical purposes, unique. Their uniqueness does not depend on a central registration authority or coordination between the parties generating them, unlike most other numbering schemes.

While the probability that a UUID will be duplicated is not zero, it is close enough to zero to be negligible. Thus, anyone can create large numbers of UUIDs and use them as identifiers with near certainty that they do not duplicate UUIDs that have been, or will be, created by others, with the only coordination required to achieve uniqueness being conformance with the UUID standards. Information labeled with UUIDs by independent parties can therefore coexist in the same databases or channels, with a negligible probability of duplication.

Adoption of UUIDs is widespread, with many computing platforms providing support for generating them and for parsing their textual representation.

== History ==
Apollo Computer used UUIDs in the Network Computing System (NCS), launched in 1987, with a design inspired by the 64-bit unique identifiers of Domain/OS, an earlier Apollo operating system. Microsoft Windows platforms adopted the NCS (and later, the DCE) design as "Globally Unique Identifiers" (GUIDs) in the early nineties.

Somewhat later, the Open Software Foundation (OSF) used UUIDs in its Distributed Computing Environment (DCE), with a design partly based on the NCS UUIDs. This was documented in the DCE 1.1 RPC specification in 1996, and in the DCE 1.1 Authentication and Security Services specification, published in 1997. ISO/IEC documented the DCE design in 1996, in ISO/IEC 11578:1996 "Information technology – Open Systems Interconnection – Remote Procedure Call".

In July 2005, the Internet Engineering Task Force (IETF) published the Standards-Track RFC 4122., which also registered a URN namespace for UUIDs. The ITU had meanwhile also standardized UUIDs, based on the previous standards and early versions of RFC 4122, in ITU-T Rec. X.667 ISO/IEC 9834-8. This was technically equivalent to RFC 4122.

The current IETF specification is RFC 9562, a Proposed Standard published in May 2024. This defined three new UUID versions (6–8) of the DCE variant. The UUIDs currently in use are the DCE/IETF design, with provision for backwards compatibility with "legacy" Apollo NCS UUIDs and Microsoft GUIDs.

The authors of RFC 4122 were Paul Leach, Michael Mealling, and Rich Salz, and the authors of the initial 1997 Internet Draft were Leach and Salz. Leach had been the Architect of Domain/OS, had continued at Apollo as a designer of NCS, and then, as a Microsoft Distinguished Architect, contributed to the design of OLE/COM/DCOM, carrying the concept of UUIDs to that project.Leach was also one of the authors of RFC 9562. Salz was a member of the DCE team at the Open Software Foundation. Apollo had merged in 1989 with Hewlett-Packard, a founding member of the OSF. Former NCS team-members, having become HP employees, brought UUIDs to OSF DCE. Mealling was a prominent IETF member, holding a seat on the Internet Engineering Steering Group, and was heavily involved in IETF work on URNs. RFC 4122 brought all these strands together.

== Format ==
A UUID is a 128-bit number. The meaning of the bits is determined by the variant, of which three are defined. Of these, the most common is variant 1, with the other variants being for backwards compatibility with previous formats or for future definition. Variants 1 and 2 have "versions", which further define the interpretation of the UUID.

=== Variants ===
The variant field is in a variable number of the most-significant bits of the ninth byte. In textual representations of the UUID, this is part of the hex digit after the third hyphen. It indicates the format of the UUID. The following variants are defined:

- Variant 0 (indicated by the one-bit pattern 0xxx_{2}, 0_{16} through 7_{16}) is for backwards compatibility with the now-obsolete Apollo Network Computing System 1.5 UUID format. The variant 0 numbering space also includes the Nil UUID.
- Variant 1 (10xx_{2}, appearing as 8_{16}, 9_{16}, a_{16} or b_{16}) UUIDs are referred to as RFC 4122/DCE 1.1 UUIDs, or "Leach–Salz" UUIDs, after the authors of the original Internet Draft. These are the UUIDs in current use.
- Variant 2 (110x_{2}, c_{16} or d_{16}) is for backwards compatibility with the "GUIDs" used in Microsoft COM/DCOM. This format was used in early GUIDs on the Microsoft Windows platform.
- Variant 3 (111x_{2}, e_{16} or f_{16}) includes the Max UUID, but is otherwise undefined and reserved for future use.

=== Versions ===
The OSF DCE and Microsoft COM/DCOM variants (1 & 2, respectively) have versions, indicated by the value of the high four bits of the seventh byte of the UUID. In textual representations of the UUID, this is the hex digit after the second hyphen. Variant 0 Apollo NCS UUIDs do not have versions, being sub-typed via "address families" rather than versions. RFC 9562, which defined versions 6, 7, and 8 stated that variants other than the OSF DCE variant 1 were "out of scope" of the RFC, leaving it to Microsoft to define new versions for variant 2. However, versions 1 and 4, as standardized in RFC 4122, are the same in the Microsoft variant, except for byte-ordering.

Comparison of UUID versions
Version	Type	Time source	Entropy/ID source	Best use case
1	Time-based	Gregorian (100 ns) & clock seq	MAC address	Legacy systems; distributed uniqueness
2	DCE Security	Gregorian (low-res) & clock seq	Local ID (UID/GID) & node	DCE-based security environments [Legacy]
3	Name-based (MD5)	None (deterministic)	Namespace & name	Deterministic IDs; legacy name-hashing
4	Random	None	Cryptographic random	General purpose; maximum privacy
5	Name-based (SHA-1)	None (deterministic)	Namespace & name	Deterministic IDs; preferred over version 3
6	Time-ordered	Gregorian (100 ns) & clock seq	MAC address or random	Database keys; reordered version 1
7	Time-ordered	Unix epoch (ms)	Cryptographic random	Modern database keys; high locality
8	Custom	Variable	Implementation-defined	Experimental or application-specific layouts

==== Versions 1 and 6 (date–time and node ID) ====
Version 1 concatenates a 48-bit node ID with a 60-bit timestamp.

The node ID is usually the MAC address of a network interface controller (NIC) on the system generating the UUID. On systems with 64-bit EUI-64 "MAC addresses", the least significant 48 bits are used.

The timestamp is the number of 100-nanosecond intervals since midnight 15 October 1582 Coordinated Universal Time (UTC), the date on which the Gregorian calendar was first adopted. RFC 4122 states that the time value rolls over in A.D. 3409, depending on the algorithm used, which implies that the 60-bit timestamp is a signed quantity. However some software, such as the libuuid library, treats the timestamp as unsigned, putting the rollover time in A.D. 5236.

A 13-bit or 14-bit "uniquifying" clock sequence extends the timestamp in order to handle cases where the processor clock does not advance fast enough, or where there are multiple processors and UUID generators per node. When UUIDs are generated faster than the system clock can advance, the lower bits of the timestamp and the clock sequence can be incremented to simulate greater precision and ensure uniqueness.

With each version-1 UUID corresponding to a single point in space (the node) and time (intervals and clock sequence), the chance of two properly generated version-1 UUIDs being unintentionally the same is practically nil. Since the time and clock sequence total 74 bits, 2^{74} (1.8×10^{22}, or 18 sextillion) version-1 UUIDs can be generated per node ID, at a maximal average rate of 163 billion per second per node ID.

Where a system does not have a MAC address, or where the use of a MAC address is undesired, a 47-bit cryptographically secure random number may also be used. In this case, the least significant bit of the node ID, corresponding to the unicast/multicast bit of a MAC address, is set to one, preventing conflict with UUIDs derived from a MAC address.

The layout of a version-1 UUID is:

UUID version 1 record layout
Field	Width (bits)	Description
time_low	32	The least significant 32 bits of the 60-bit timestamp
time_mid	16	The middle 16 bits of the 60-bit timestamp
version	4	The 4-bit version number (0001)
time_high	12	The most significant 12 bits of the 60-bit timestamp
variant	2	The 2-bit variant (10)
clock_seq	14	The 14-bit clock sequence
node	48	The 48-bit node ID

Version 6 is the same as version 1 except for the order of the timestamp bits. In version 6, timestamp bits are ordered from most significant to least significant. This allows systems to sort version-6 UUIDs in order of creation simply by sorting them lexically. By reinstating the original NCS hi-lo byte order of the timestamp to enable sortability, version 6 is even more similar to "legacy" variant 0 NCS UUIDs than version 1.

UUID version-6 record layout
Field	Width (bits)	Description
time_high	32	The most significant 32 bits of the 60-bit timestamp
time_mid	16	The middle 16 bits of the 60-bit timestamp
version	4	The 4-bit version number (0110)
time_low	12	The least significant 12 bits of the 60-bit timestamp
variant	2	The 2-bit variant (10)
clock_seq	14	The 14-bit clock sequence
node	48	The 48-bit node ID

==== Version 2 (date–time and MAC address, DCE security version) ====
RFCs 4122 and 9562 reserve version 2 for "DCE security" UUIDs; but do not provide any details. RFC 9562 declares them "out of scope". Many UUID implementations and libraries omit version 2. However, version-2 UUIDs are defined in the DCE 1.1 Authentication and Security Services specification.

UUID version-2 record layout
Field	Width (bits)	Description
local_id	32	32-bit local identifier (typically a POSIX UID or GID)
time_mid	16	The middle 16 bits of the 60-bit timestamp
version	4	The four-bit version number (0010)
time_hi	12	The high 12 bits of the timestamp
variant	2	The two-bit variant (10)
clock_seq_low	6	The low 6 bits of the clock sequence
local_id_domain	8	Identifier domain (e.g., 0 for UID, 1 for GID)
node	48	The 48-bit node ID (typically the MAC address)

Version-2 UUIDs are similar to version 1, except that the least significant 8 bits of the clock sequence are replaced by a "local domain" number, and the least significant 32 bits of the 60-bit Gregorian timestamp are replaced by an integer identifier meaningful within the specified local domain. On POSIX systems, local-domain numbers 0 and 1 are for user ids (UIDs) and group ids (GIDs) respectively, and other local-domain numbers are site-defined. On non-POSIX systems, all local domain numbers are site-defined.

Thus, version-2 UUIDs are a way to combine a 32-bit local, node-scoped identifier of a specified 8-bit type ("domain") with the identifier of the node and a Gregorian-origin timestamp, transforming the node-scoped identifier into one that is universally unique. The tradeoff is that the timestamp is low-res in comparison to the timestamps in version 1, ticking only once every 429.49 seconds, a little more than 7 minutes, quite different from the 100 nanosecond ticks in version 1.

==== Versions 3 and 5 (namespace name-based) ====
Version-3 and version-5 UUIDs are generated by hashing a namespace identifier and name. Version 3 uses MD5 as the hashing algorithm, and version 5 uses SHA-1. This is useful when systems need to determine a UUID based on a set of other names or identifiers without reference to a central registry.

The namespace identifier is itself a UUID. The RFC provides constant UUIDs to represent the namespaces for URLs, fully qualified domain names, object identifiers, and X.500 distinguished names; but any desired UUID may be used as a namespace designator. There is an IANA registry for additional namespace ids.

To determine the version-3 UUID corresponding to a given namespace and name, the UUID of the namespace is transformed to a string of bytes, concatenated with the input name, then hashed with MD5, yielding 128 bits. Then six bits are replaced by fixed values, the four-bit version (0011_{2} for version 3), and the two-bit 10_{2} for variant 1. Since 6 bits are thus predetermined, only 122 bits contribute to the uniqueness of the UUID.

Version-5 UUIDs are similar, but SHA-1 is used instead of MD5. Since SHA-1 generates 160-bit digests, the digest is truncated to 128 bits before the version and variant bits are replaced.

Version-3 and version-5 UUIDs have the property that, given the version, the same namespace and name will map to the same UUID. However, neither the namespace nor name can be determined from the UUID, even if one of them is specified, except by brute-force search. Depending on the application, this may be viewed as a desirable feature or as the potential for a collision. When viewed as a feature, it requires out-of-band coordination regarding the selection of namespaces and names.

RFC 4122 recommends version 5 (SHA-1) over version 3 (MD5). This is because it is believed that MD5 is more prone to collisions than SHA-1, though MD5 is somewhat faster. The RFC warns against use of UUIDs of any version as security capabilities.

==== Version 4 (random) ====
A version-4 UUID is randomly generated. As in other UUIDs, four bits are used to indicate version 4, and two or three bits to indicate the variant (10_{2} or 110_{2} for variants 1 and 2 respectively). Thus, for variant 1 (that is, most UUIDs) a random version-4 UUID will have six predetermined variant and version bits, leaving 122 bits for the randomly generated part, for a total of 2^{122}, or 5.3×10^{36} (5.3 undecillion) possible version-4, variant-1 UUIDs. There are half as many possible version-4, variant 2 UUIDs (legacy GUIDs) because there is one less random bit available, three bits being consumed for the variant.

==== Version 7 (timestamp and random) ====
Version-7 UUIDs are intended as monotonically ascending, creation-time-ordered, lexically sortable keys in large databases and distributed systems, contributing to locality and performance. With version 7 as database keys, "new" records are inserted at the logical end of the key sequence, and records which are close in time are near each other in the key sequence. This contrasts with the random version 4, which when used as database keys, are evenly and randomly dispersed across the key sequence, even when the underlying records are close in time, negatively affecting performance in many types of databases.

They are constructed as follows:

UUID Version-7 Record Layout
Field	Width (bits)	Description
unix_ts_ms	48	48-bit Unix epoch timestamp in milliseconds
version	4	The four-bit version number (0111)
rand_a	12	12 bits of sub-millisecond timestamp precision, a monotonicity counter, or pseudo-random data
variant	2	The two-bit variant (10)
rand_b	62	62 bits of a monotonicity counter, or pseudo-random data

In addition to the timestamp, provision is made for a total of 74 bits for the three optional constructs (timestamp extra precision, seeded counter, random data) but apart from the ordering of the constructs and a requirement that at most 12 bits be used for extra timestamp precision, the number of bits allocated to each construct (including possibly 0) and the details of the constructs are left to the implementer. The 48-bit timestamps may be altered, fuzzed, or smeared for the sake of monotonicity and privacy, and it is explicitly stated that there is no requirement about how close a timestamp needs to be to the actual (Unix) time. But the intent is clear that the timestamps should be monotonic and approximate Unix time, and the RFC states that custom UUID version 8 should be used for timestamp-based designs that are not Unix time. Unlike some other UUID versions, version-7 UUIDs do not incorporate MAC addresses, and can steer clear of the privacy issues associated with them.

==== Version 8 (custom) ====
Version 8 UUIDs are unspecified except for the variant and version, effectively allocating one-sixteenth of the UUID variant 1 identifier space for private, experimental, non-standard, or vendor-specific identifiers. RFC 9562 suggests, for example, that version 8 might be used for a name/hash-based identifier using a hashing function other than MD5 (version 3) or SHA-1 (version 5). The RFC also suggests that version 8 can be used for timestamp-based UUID designs that do not fit within versions 6 or 7, such as using a different epoch.

In essence, version 8 UUIDs are 128 bit integers with 122 opaque bits generated by any desired method, plus 4 version bits (binary 1000), and 2 variant bits (binary 10). RFC 9562 warns that their uniqueness should not be assumed. In general, without external coordination or documentation, the source, generation method, internal structure, collision probability, and other properties of version-8 UUIDs cannot be determined.

==== Use of MAC addresses ====
In contrast to the other UUID versions, versions 1, 2, and 6 are based on MAC addresses from network cards, relying for their uniqueness in part on an identifier issued by a central registration authority, namely the Organizationally Unique Identifier (OUI) part of the MAC address, which is issued by the IEEE mainly to manufacturers of networking equipment. The uniqueness of the UUIDs based on network-card MAC addresses also depends on network equipment manufacturers properly assigning unique MAC addresses to their equipment which, like other manufacturing processes, is subject to error. MAC addresses also may come from sources other than network hardware. For example, virtual machines receive a MAC address from a range that is configurable in the hypervisor, and some operating systems permit the end user to customise the MAC addresses on devices, notably OpenWrt. When a device has an EUI-64 64-bit "MAC address", using the least significant 48 bits of it, as recommended by the RFC, may result in the node ID part of the UUID being duplicated. Thus, node IDs based on MAC addresses may not be globally unique.

Usage of the node's network card MAC address for the node ID does often mean that version-1, -2, and -6 UUIDs can be tracked back to the computer that created them. Such UUIDs can be used to infer what kind of hardware is being used to generate the UUIDs. Documents can sometimes be traced to the computers where they were created or edited through UUIDs embedded into them by word processing software. This privacy hole was used when locating the creator of the Melissa virus.

RFC 9562 does allow the MAC address in a version-1, -2 or -6 UUID to be replaced by a random 48-bit node ID, either because the node does not have a MAC address, or because it is not desirable to include it. In that case, the RFC requires that the least significant bit of the first octet of the node ID should be set to 1. This corresponds to the multicast bit in MAC addresses, and setting it serves to differentiate UUIDs where the node ID is randomly generated from UUIDs based on MAC addresses from network cards, which typically have unicast MAC addresses.

==== Use of timestamps ====
Versions 1, 2, 6, and 7 are based on, and expose, the time when the UUID was generated, which often corresponds to the creation of a record, or an historical event. If associated with people or their activity, it may be possible to infer a person's age or the precise time of their activities from UUIDs. It may be possible to determine from time-based monotonically-ascending UUIDs when a system went live, or what objects in a system are new or recently updated. If the identified objects represent product orders or user sign-ups, for example, it may be possible to determine user growth or sales volume over time from the UUIDs. Thus, time-based UUIDs, if publicly visible, may leak personal or business information, raise privacy concerns, and facilitate unwanted data mining.

Concerning the time-ordering and sortability of UUIDs, version 1 and 2 start "in the middle" with the 32 low bits of the timestamp. These two versions, along with 3–5 and 8, do not sort lexically into time order. The role of the timestamp in these UUID versions was not to make UUIDs readily orderable in time but rather to achieve universal uniqueness by fixing the generation in space and time.

Versions 6 and 7 prioritize the timestamp's role in database indexing, allowing for lexical sorting of records into chronological order. However, RFC 9562 provides significant implementation flexibility for version 7, defining a general framework rather than a rigid bit-layout for optional sub-millisecond timestamp precision, counters, and randomness.

The specification allows the 48-bit Unix timestamp to be adjusted or "fuzzed" to maintain monotonicity (ensuring IDs created in rapid succession always increase) or to enhance privacy. Because the RFC does not define a strict maximum deviation from actual Unix time, different implementations may vary in how they balance chronological accuracy against these other requirements.

Consequently, the lexical sortability of versions 6 and 7 UUIDs is most consistent when generated by the same library or system. Mixing UUIDs from different sources, or interleaving different versions and variants in a single database, can degrade the time-ordering and index locality that these versions were designed to provide.

RFC 9562 does not mandate a minimum number of random bits for version 7; it allows the sub-millisecond precision and monotonicity counter fields to occupy the remainder of the 128-bit structure. Consequently, collision resistance and guessability depend entirely on the specific implementation's allocation of these bits.

== Special values ==
The Nil UUID is 00000000-0000-0000-0000-000000000000 (that is, all clear bits), which can be useful to express the concept of "no such value". This is a "variant 0" NCS UUID with an address family of "0", defined in NCS as "unspecified or uninitialized". The Max UUID, sometimes also called the Omni UUID, is FFFFFFFF-FFFF-FFFF-FFFF-FFFFFFFFFFFF (that is, all set bits). This is intended to be used for expressing "end of UUID list", and is the only value defined in the "variant 3" space.

== Encoding ==
=== Binary representation ===
Initially, Apollo Computer designed the UUID for NCS with the following wire format, based on a timestamp and a node identifier, similarly to version 1 and 6

Apollo NCS UUID Record Layout
Field	Width (bits)	Description
time_high	32	High-order 32 bits of the 48-bit system clock, ticking every 4 microseconds, origin=Jan 1, 1980
time_low	16	Low-order 16 bits of the 48-bit system clock
reserved	16	Reserved field (often 0)
family	8	Address family (e.g., 0x00 for unspecified, 0x02 for IP, 0x0D for DDS)
host	56	56-bit host identifier (network address)

Note that the timestamp would have wrapped on September 5, 2015; but the heyday of NCS was 1987 to 1989 and it was effectively deprecated in 1992 when, having been acquired by Hewlett-Packard, it was incorporated into DCE/RPC. In 2005, RFC 4122 incorporated legacy NCS UUIDs as "variant 0" of the new format by overlapping the UUID variant bits with the NCS Address Family field. Since the highest address family value defined in NCS was 13 (hex x0D), and only address families x00 (unspecified), x02 (IPv4), and x0D (Domain Discovery) were actually assigned in production, the most significant bit in the variant octet was always 0 for extant NCS UUIDs. In effect, NCS address families 0–127 (0x00-0x7F hex) became "variant 0", while the numbering space of NCS address families 128–255 (0x80-0xFF hex) was rededicated to the new variants. The result was that legacy NCS UUIDs and IETF/DCE UUIDs could be separated and coexist in the same databases and communication channels.

Family / variant field
MSB 0	MSB 1	MSB 2	Family (octet)	Variant	Description
0	x	x	x00-0x7F	0	Reserved. Apollo NCS backward compatibility, plus Nil. Subtyped by address family.
1	0	x	x80-xBF	1	OSF DCE UUID. Subtyped by versions (1-8).
1	1	0	xC0-xDF	2	Reserved. Microsoft backward compatibility.
1	1	1	xE0-xFF	3	Reserved (Future, plus Max).

The legacy Apollo NCS UUID has the format described in the previous table. The OSF DCE UUID variant is described in RFC 9562.

The Microsoft COM / DCOM variant 2 UUIDs are out of scope for RFC 9562 and are left for definition by Microsoft. In the period before RFC 4122 was published, Variant 2 GUIDs with the version field set to 0 were used by Microsoft for OLE/COM/DCOM identifiers. While OLE, COM and DCOM are firmly legacy, having been superseded by .NET around 2002, many of the identifiers are still fundamental to current Windows operating systems. Variant 2 version 1 and 4 GUIDs, analogous to the corresponding Variant 1 versions, were also generated, mainly in Windows 95 and Windows NT, but with subfields byte-swapped (See below). Variant 2 UUIDs with other versions were never defined and current Microsoft tools and libraries do not generate variant 2 GUIDs of any version, having switched to standard variant 1 IETF/DCE UUIDs around 2002.

RFCs 4122 / 9562 Variant 1-3 Layout
Field	Width (bits)	Description
data_a	32	First 32 bits of the timestamp or data
data_b	16	Second 16 bits of the timestamp or data
version	4	The version number (bits 48 through 51)
data_c	12	Third 12 bits of the timestamp or data (bits 52 through 63)
variant	2-3	The RFC 9562 Variant bits (10x, 110, 111, bits 64-66)
data_d	13-14	The clock sequence or other data (bits 66 or 67 through 79)
data_e	48	The 48-bit node ID or other data (bits 80 through 127)

The interpretation of the various bit fields varies in variants 1 and 2 according to the "version". In variant 2, data_a, data_b, version|data_c are byte-swapped and variant|data_d and data_e are not byte-swapped.

==== Byte ordering ====
Variant 1 UUIDs are sequentially encoded in big-endian. For example, 00112233-4455-6677-8899-aabbccddeeff is encoded as the bytes 00 11 22 33 44 55 66 77 88 99 aa bb cc dd ee ff.

In contrast, variant 2 UUIDs ("GUIDs"), historically used in Microsoft COM/OLE libraries, have a mixed-endian format, with the first three fields (corresponding to version-1 timestamp subfields) being little-endian, while the final two fields are emitted as big-endian arrays of bytes. The example UUID above, if it were a variant 2 UUID, would be encoded on the wire as 33 22 11 00 55 44 77 66 88 99 aa bb cc dd ee ff. All versions under variant 2 are emitted with this byte ordering.

=== Textual representation ===
In most cases, UUIDs are represented as hexadecimal values separated by hyphens. Most used is the 8-4-4-4-12 format, a string of 32 hexadecimal digits with four hyphens, xxxxxxxx-xxxx-vxxx-wxxx-xxxxxxxxxxxx. The hyphens separate the version-1 fields but the same format is commonly used for all versions. Every hexadecimal digit represents 4 bits; v represents the version nibble; and the high-order one to three bits of w are the variant. The Windows registry format is the same but wraps the UUID in {} braces. The byte-ordering differences of variant 2 are applicable in binary storage or transmission on the wire, and do not affect the textual presentation of the UUID.

Though they are still occasionally omitted, the format with hyphens was introduced with the newer variant system. Before that, the legacy Apollo format used a slightly different format 34dc23469000.0d.00.00.7c.5f.00.00.00. The first part is the time (time_high and time_low combined). The reserved field is skipped. The family field comes directly after the first dot, so in this case 0d (13 in decimal) for DDS (Data Distribution Service). The remaining parts, each separated with a dot, are the node bytes.

Lowercase hexadecimal digits are preferred. ITU-T Rec. X.667 requires lowercase on generation, but also requires the uppercase version to be accepted on input. Since UUIDs are 128-bit numbers, other formats are possible, and occasionally seen, such as decimal digits or binary.

RFC 4122 registers the "uuid" namespace for URNs. This makes it possible to form URNs from UUIDs, like urn:uuid:550e8400-e29b-41d4-a716-446655440000. The normal 8-4-4-4-12 format is used for this.

It is also possible to make an OID out of a UUID, which in turn provides another way to make a URN from it. The OID for the previous example is 2.25.113059749145936325402354257176981405696. The unsigned decimal form of the UUID is prefixed with 2.25, which represents the {joint-iso-itu-t(2) uuid(25)} "arc" within the OID namespace. This may be further prefixed with urn:oid: to make a second form of URN for UUIDs. In general, the uuid URN is recommended over the oid URN.

== Collisions ==
A collision occurs when the same UUID is generated more than once and is assigned to different referents. In the case of many standard version-1, -2, or -6 UUIDs using unique MAC addresses and/or timestamps, collisions can occur only as a result of deliberate construction or error, such as manufacturing problems, skewed clocks, or software bugs.

Duplicate UUIDs can also occur due to error with the UUID versions generated using processes such as random number generation or hashing. It is important, for example, to have a high-entropy source of randomness when generating version-4 UUIDs. But collisions can also occur without error with such UUIDs, due to chance -- "bad luck".

The probability of this is normally so small that it can be ignored, and can be computed precisely based on analysis of the birthday problem. For example, the number of random version-4 UUIDs which need to be generated in order to have a 50% probability of at least one collision is 2.71 quintillion, computed as follows:

$n \approx \frac{1}{2} + \sqrt{\frac{1}{4} + \ln(2) \times 2^{123}} \approx 2.71 \times 10^{18}.$

This number would be equivalent to generating 1 billion UUIDs per second for about 86 years. A file containing this many UUIDs, at 16 bytes per UUID, would be about 43.4 exabytes (37.7 EiB) -- a file, listing only identifiers, a few orders of magnitude larger than the largest databases currently in existence, which are on the order of 100 PB (e.g. Google's web indexes). If generated according to the standards, duplicate UUIDs are more likely to be the result of bit-flips (a so called Single-event upset) caused by cosmic rays passing through memory or disk storage, than the result of mischance at UUID-generation time.

The smallest number of version-4 UUIDs which must be generated for the probability of finding at least one collision to be p is approximated by the formula

$\sqrt{2^{123} \times \ln\frac{1}{1 - p}}.$

Thus, the probability to find a duplicate within 103 trillion properly-generated version-4 UUIDs is one in a billion.

== Uses ==
=== Filesystems ===
Several filesystem types (for example, ext4 and Btrfs) use a UUID to uniquely identify each filesystem to the operating system. (NTFS and FAT32 do not, utilising a shorter UID (Unique identifier) instead.)

An /etc/fstab file might assign mount points based on these UUIDs (or a UID for a FAT32 EFI system partition (ESP)):

# device-uuid                              mount-point            fs-type options   dump pass
UUID=b18e3b6c-ccb7-4308-b527-35e5e6ee2145  /                      btrfs   defaults  0  0
UUID=103C-86D6                             /efi                   vfat    utf8      0  2
UUID=64f3cb6a-e70e-45e5-8b90-d86cddbab7bb  swap                   swap    defaults  0  0
UUID=eda746c6-1f1b-4cf1-9225-d8b0b46511cc  /mnt/Stuff             btrfs   defaults  0  0

=== Partition tables ===
The GUID Partition Table (GPT) uses UUIDs (called there "GUID"s) to identify partitions and partition types. Unique partition IDs are assigned locally by the operating system. Partition type IDs are well-known numbers, usually assigned by operating-system or hardware vendors.

=== Microsoft COM ===
There are several flavors of GUIDs used in Microsoft's Component Object Model (COM):

- IID – interface identifier; (The ones that are registered on a system are stored in the Windows Registry at [HKEY_CLASSES_ROOT\Interface] )
- CLSID – class identifier; (Stored at [HKEY_CLASSES_ROOT\CLSID]). In practice it is not entirely separate from the IID space, because remoting the interface can require a proxy/stub object which some toolsets used to create with a CLSID equal to the interface's IID.
- LIBID – type library identifier; (Stored at [HKEY_CLASSES_ROOT\TypeLib])
- CATID – category identifier; (its presence on a class identifies it as belonging to certain class categories, listed at [HKEY_CLASSES_ROOT\Component Categories])

=== Databases ===
UUIDs are commonly used as a unique key in database tables. The NEWID function in Microsoft SQL Server version 4 Transact-SQL returns standard random version-4 UUIDs, while the NEWSEQUENTIALID function returns 128-bit identifiers similar to UUIDs which are committed to ascend in sequence until the next system reboot. The Oracle Database SYS_GUID function does not return a standard GUID, despite the name. Instead, it returns a 16-byte 128-bit RAW value based on a host identifier and a process or thread identifier, somewhat similar to a GUID. PostgreSQL contains a UUID datatype and can generate most versions of UUIDs through the use of functions from modules. MySQL provides a UUID function which generates standard version-1 UUIDs.

The random nature of standard UUIDs of versions 3, 4, and 5, and the ordering of the fields within standard versions 1 and 2 may create problems with database locality or performance when UUIDs are used as primary keys. For example, in 2002 Jimmy Nilsson reported a significant improvement in performance with Microsoft SQL Server when the version-4 UUIDs being used as keys were modified to include a non-random suffix based on system time. By reordering and encoding version-1 and -2 UUIDs so that the timestamp comes first, insertion performance loss can be averted. This is the rationale for variant 1 (DCE) versions 6 and 7, standardized in RFC 9562.

=== Other examples ===
UEFI and ACPI are examples that use GUID.

== See also ==
- Birthday attack
- Object identifier (OID)
- Uniform Resource Identifier (URI)
- Snowflake ID
- World Wide Name (WWN)
- Decentralized identifier
