= NDR =

NDR may refer to:

== Computing ==
- Non delivery report, a return email message to a sender indicating failed message delivery
- Network Data Representation, an implementation of the OSI model presentation layer
- Network detection and response, detection of abnormal system behaviors on network traffic data

== Science and technology ==
- Negative differential resistance
- Naming and Design Rules in metadata
- Neighborhood deformation retract, a kind of topological subspace
- National Data Repository, a system to store data about a nation's natural resources
- Nonlinear dispersion relation, in plasma physics

== Others ==
- IATA code for Nador International Airport, airport in Morocco
- Postal code for Nadur, Gozo, Malta
- National Driver Register, United States
- Non-invasive disc rehabilitation, NDR Method
- Norddeutscher Rundfunk, a public radio and television broadcaster in northern Germany
- Norwich Northern Distributor Road or Broadland Northway, a major route around the north of Norwich, England
- North Diversion Road, which is a nickname to North Luzon Expressway and formerly its official name
- Our Home – Russia (Russian: Наш Дом Россия, romanized: Nash Dom Rossiya), defunct Russian political party
- Singapore National Day Rally, an annual address that the Prime Minister of Singapore makes to the nation
