= Port 135 =

Port 135 may refer to:

- in computing — Distributed Computing Environment (DCE), a framework and toolkit for developing client/server applications
- in Internet — Remote procedure call (RPC), a communication process that allows for executing a subroutine or procedure in another address space
