= Ilu =

Ilu or ILU may refer to:

- Ilu (drum), a Brazilian instrument
- Ilu, Iran, a village in Kurdistan Province, Iran
- Inter-Language Unification, WWW project
- International Longshoremen's Association, labor union
- Incomplete LU factorization
- ilu, the nominative plural masculine form of the Akkadian stem il-, "god"
- A species of plesiosaur-like creatures from the film franchise Avatar
- Abbreviation of the phrase "I Love You" in texting slang
