= Interface description language =

Computer language used to describe a software component's interface

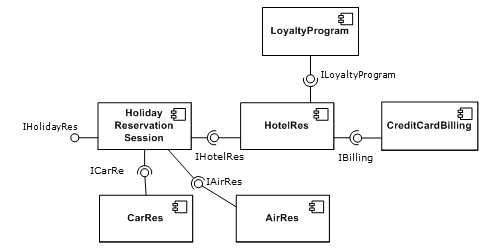
Representation of different software components performing a hypothetical holiday reservation with UML

An interface description language or interface definition language (IDL) is a generic term for a computer programming language that lets a program or object written in one programming language communicate with another program written in an unknown programming language. IDLs are usually used to describe data types and interfaces in a language-independent way, for example, between those written in C++ and those written in Java.

IDLs are commonly used in remote procedure call software. In these cases, the machines at either end of the link may be using different operating systems and computer languages. IDLs offer a bridge between the two different operating systems.

Software systems based on IDLs include Sun Microsystems' Sun RPC, The Open Group's Distributed Computing Environment, the IBM System Object Model, the Object Management Group's Common Object Request Broker Architecture (CORBA) (which implements OMG IDL, an IDL based on DCE/RPC) and Data Distribution Service, Mozilla's XPCOM, Microsoft RPC (which evolved into Component Object Model (COM) and Distributed Component Object Model (DCOM)), and Web Services Description Language (WSDL) for Web services.

== Examples ==
- AIDL: Java-based, for Android; supports local and remote procedure calls; can be accessed from native applications by calling through Java Native Interface (JNI)
- Apache Thrift: from Apache, originally developed by Facebook
- Avro IDL: for the Apache Avro system
- ASN.1
- Cap'n Proto: created by its former maintainer, avoids some of the perceived shortcomings of Protocol Buffers.
- Concise Data Definition Language (CDDL, RFC 8610): A Notation for CBOR and JSON data structures
- CortoScript: Describe data and/or interfaces for systems that require Semantic interoperability
- Etch: Cisco's Etch Cross-platform Service Description Language
- Extensible Data Notation (EDN): Clojure data format, similar to JSON
- FlatBuffers: Serialization format from Google supporting zero-copy deserialization
- Franca IDL: the open-source Franca interface definition language
- FIDL: Interface description language for the Fuchsia Operating System designed for writing app components in C, C++, Dart, Go and Rust.
- IDL specification language: the original Interface Description Language
- IPL: Imandra Protocol Language
- JSON Web-Service Protocol (JSON-WSP)
- Lightweight Imaging Device Interface Language
- Microsoft Interface Definition Language (MIDL): the Microsoft extension of OMG IDL to add support for Component Object Model (COM) and Distributed Component Object Model (DCOM)
- OMG IDL: standardized by Object Management Group, used in CORBA (for DCE/RPC services) and DDS (for data modeling), also selected by the W3C for exposing the DOM of XML, HTML, and CSS documents
- OpenAPI Specification: a standard for Web APIs, used by Swagger and other technologies.
- Open Service Interface Definitions
- Protocol Buffers: Google's IDL
- RESTful Service Description Language (RSDL)
- Smithy: An AWS-invented protocol-agnostic interface definition language.
- Specification Language for Internet Communications Engine (Ice: Slice)
- Universal Network Objects: OpenOffice.org's component model
- Web Application Description Language (WADL)
- Web IDL by WHATWG: can be used to describe interfaces that are intended to be implemented in web browsers
- Web Services Description Language (WSDL)
- XCB: X protocol description language for X Window System
- Cross Platform Interface Description Language (XPIDL): Mozilla's way to specify XPCOM interfaces

== See also ==
- Component-based software engineering
- Interface-based programming
- Java Interface Definition Language
- List of computing and IT abbreviations
- Universal Interface Language
- User interface markup language
