= IDL specification language =

Software interface description language

IDL (Interface Description Language) is a software interface description language (or interface descriptor language) created by William Wulf and John Nestor of Carnegie Mellon University in the United States, and David Lamb of Queen's University in Canada.

== History ==
Like other interface description languages, IDL defined interfaces in a language- and machine- independent way, allowing the specification of interfaces between components written in different languages, and possibly executing on different machines using remote procedure calls.

The Karlsruhe Ada compilation system used IDL resp. DIANA and its predecessor AIDA, and for marshalling the vanilla IDL External Representation.

BiiN's DBMS used IDL as well, and for marshalling a more compact binary IDL External Representation.
