= GIDL =

Gidl is a family name.

GIDL is an initialism that may stand for:

- Gate-induced drain leakage, a leakage mechanism in MOSFETs due to large field effect in the drain junction
- Generic Interface Definition Language, an extension to CORBA IDL
