= Distributed environment =

Distributed environment may refer to:

- Distributed computing, about the computer science field of distributed computing
- Distributed computing environment, about the software system developed in the 1980s
