= XPIDL =

XPCOM interface definition language

Cross Platform Interface Description Language (XPIDL) is the interface definition language developed by Mozilla.org to specify XPCOM interfaces.

It is similar to the Object Management Group's CORBA IDL.

Mozilla provides a utility xpidl that converts the IDL files into XPCOM Type Library (.xpt) files.
