= ZeroC =

ZeroC, Inc.
- Type: Private
- Industry: Software industry
- Founded: October 27, 2002
- Headquarters: Jupiter, Florida, United States
- Area served: Worldwide
- Website: zeroc.com

ZeroC is a software company based in Jupiter, Florida, United States. The company was founded by Marc Laukien in 2002.

The company develops and publishes tools for software developers. Its main products are Ice, a framework for building distributed applications, and IceRPC, an RPC framework over the QUIC transport. Both Ice and IceRPC are open-source and developed on GitHub, with binary packages available from common software repositories.

== Products ==
- Ice
- IceRPC
