= Snowflake ID =

Unique identifiers used by X (formerly Twitter)

2122769488683204608

Snowflake ID
- Other names: Twitter Snowflake; X Snowflake

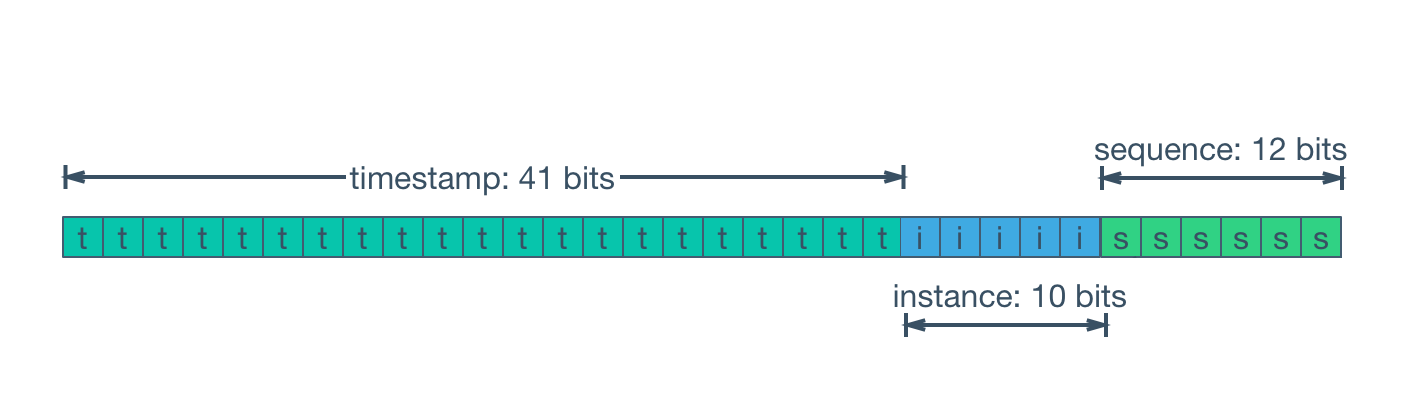
Components of a snowflake identifier in binary

Snowflake IDs, or snowflakes, are a form of unique identifier used in distributed computing. The format was created by Twitter (now X) and is used for the IDs of tweets. It is popularly believed that every snowflake has a unique structure, so they took the name "snowflake ID". The format has been adopted by other companies, including Discord, Fluxer and Instagram. The Mastodon social network uses a modified version.

== Format ==
A snowflake is composed of 64 bits:

- The highest-order bit is always 0.
- The next 41 bits encode a timestamp, representing milliseconds since the chosen epoch.
- The next 10 bits represent a machine ID, preventing clashes.
- The next 12 more bits represent a per-machine sequence number, to allow creation of multiple snowflakes in the same millisecond.

Only 63 bits are variable, so that a non-negative number can be processed readily as a 64-bit signed integer; the final number is generally serialized textually as a decimal number.

Snowflakes are sortable by time, because they are based on the time they were created. Additionally, the time a snowflake was created can be calculated from the snowflake. This can be used to get snowflakes (and their associated objects) that were created before or after a particular date.

Fixed header format
Offsets	Octet	0								1								2								3							
Octet	Bit	0	1	2	3	4	5	6	7	8	9	10	11	12	13	14	15	16	17	18	19	20	21	22	23	24	25	26	27	28	29	30	31
0	0	0	Timestamp - first 31 bits																														
4	32	Timestamp - last 10 bits										Machine ID										Machine Sequence Number											

=== Example ===
A tweet produced by @Wikipedia in February 2025 has the snowflake ID 1888944671579078978. The number may be converted to binary as 0001 1010 0011 0110 1110 0001 0010 1011 1011 0101 11 | 01 0110 1000 | 0001 0100 0010, with pipe symbols denoting the three parts of the ID.

- The first 41 (+ 1 top zero bit) bits convert to decimal as 450359504599. Add the value to the X Epoch of 1288834974657 (in Unix time milliseconds), the Unix time of the tweet is therefore 1739194479256: February 10, 2025 13:34:39.256 UTC.
- The middle 10 bits 01 0110 1000 are the machine ID.
- The last 12 bits 0001 0100 0010 decode to 322, meaning this tweet is the 322'nd snowflake processed this millisecond.

== Usage ==
The format was first announced by Twitter in June 2010. Due to implementation challenges, they waited until later in the year to roll out the update.

- X (formerly Twitter) uses snowflake IDs for tweets, direct messages, users, lists, and all other objects available over the API.
- The 10-bit machine ID field can be further split into sub-fields by a given implementation. For example, the archived version of the original Twitter snowflake library in Scala splits it into a 5-bit data center ID and a 5-bit worker ID.
- Discord also uses snowflakes, with their epoch set to 1420070400000, which translates to the zeroth second of the year 2015.
- Instagram uses a modified version of the format, with 41 bits for a timestamp, 13 bits for a shard ID, and 10 bits for a sequence number.
- Mastodon's modified format has 48 bits for a millisecond-level timestamp, as it uses the UNIX epoch. The remaining 16 bits are for sequence data.
- Fluxer also uses snowflakes, with their epoch set to 1420070400000 like Discord, which translates to the zeroth second of the year 2015.

== See also ==
- Universally unique identifier
