= Lightweight Imaging Device Interface Language =

Lightweight Imaging Device Interface Language (abbr. LIDIL) is a printer interface definition language used in more recent Hewlett-Packard printers.

This language is commonly used on HP Deskjets that do not support the PCL printer language. As the name suggests, the language only supports the definition of raster documents, and is very limited overall. It is a "host-based" protocol which is advertised with LDL in the CMD: (command set) field of the device ID string. Such models do not support printing ASCII text.
