= Internet Communications Engine =

Framework for remote procedure calls

- Developer: ZeroC
- Stable release: 3.8.0 / December 17, 2025; 2 days ago
- Repository: github.com/zeroc-ice/ice
- Platform: Cross-platform
- Type: Remote procedure call framework
- License: GPL / Proprietary
- Website: zeroc.com

The Internet Communications Engine, or Ice, is an open-source RPC framework developed by ZeroC. It provides SDKs for C++, C#, Java, JavaScript, MATLAB, Objective-C, PHP, Python, Ruby and Swift, and can run on various operating systems, including Linux, Windows, macOS, iOS and Android.

Ice implements a proprietary application layer communications protocol, called the Ice protocol, that can run over TCP, TLS, UDP, WebSocket and Bluetooth. As its name indicates, Ice can be suitable for applications that communicate over the Internet, and includes functionality for traversing firewalls.

== History ==
Initially released in February 2003, Ice was influenced by the Common Object Request Broker Architecture (CORBA) in its design, and indeed was created by several influential CORBA developers, including Michi Henning.

However, according to ZeroC, it was smaller and less complex than CORBA because it was designed by a small group of experienced developers, instead of suffering from design by committee.

In 2004, it was reported that a game called "Wish" by a company named Mutable Realms used Ice. In 2008, it was reported that Big Bear Solar Observatory had used the software since 2005. The source code repository for Ice is on GitHub since May 2015.

== Components ==
Ice components include object-oriented remote-object-invocation, replication, grid-computing, failover, load-balancing, firewall-traversals and publish-subscribe services. To gain access to those services, applications are linked to a stub library or assembly, which is generated from a language-independent IDL-like syntax called slice.

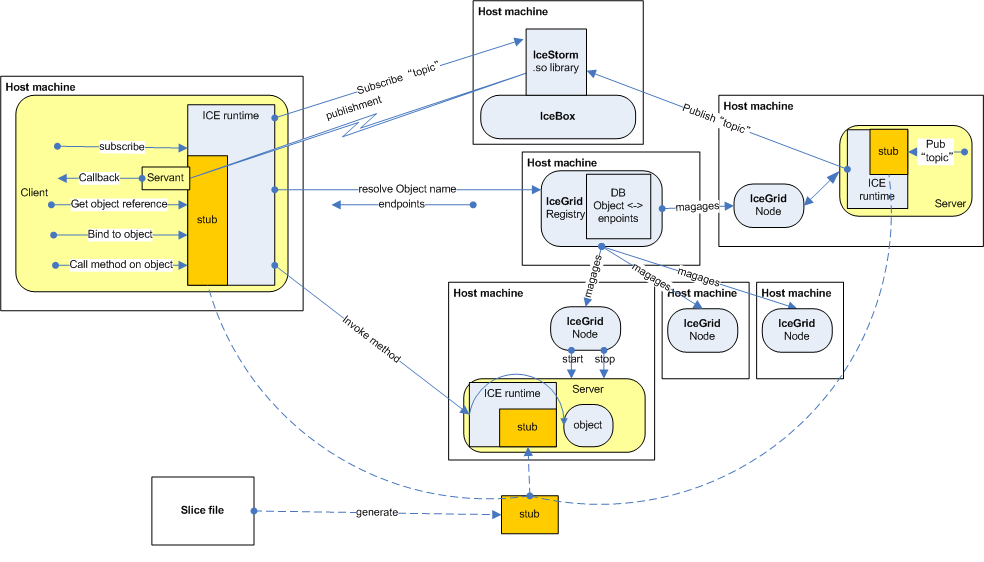

=== IceStorm ===
is an object-oriented publish-and-subscribe framework that also supports federation and quality-of-service. Unlike other publish-subscribe frameworks such as Tibco Software's Rendezvous or SmartSockets, message content consist of objects of well defined classes rather than of structured text.

=== IceGrid ===
is a suite of frameworks that provide object-oriented load balancing, failover, object-discovery and registry services.

=== Glacier ===
is a proxy-based service to enable communication through firewalls, thus making ICE an internet communication engine.

=== IceBox ===
Icebox is a service-oriented architecture container of executable services implemented in .dll or .so libraries. This is a lighter alternative to building entire executable for every service.

=== Slice ===
Slice is a ZeroC-proprietary file format that programmers follow to edit computer-language independent declarations and definitions of classes, interfaces, structures and enumerations. Slice definition files are used as input to the stub generating process. The stub in turn is linked to applications and servers that should communicate with one another based on interfaces and classes as declared/defined by the slice definitions.

Apart from CORBA, classes and interfaces support inheritance and abstract classes. In addition, slice provides configuration options in form of macros and attributes to direct the code generation process. An example is the directive to generate a certain STL list<double> template instead of the default, which is to generate a STL vector<double> template.

== See also ==
- Cisco's Etch
- Google's gRPC
- SOAP
- Apache Thrift
- Microsoft's WCF
