= Universal Interface Language =

A universal interface language is a language that allows for an interchange of information between objects. It does this by allowing an object to experiment on another object to determine what the object can do. Alan Kay introduced the concept in 1997 during his keynote speech at OOPSLA.

The goal of a universal interface language is to achieve automatic interoperability beyond that provided by an interface description language or a message exchange protocol such as Simple Object Access Protocol (SOAP).

== Usage ==
There are currently no known implementations of a Universal Interface Language. Based on Kay's description, we would expect each object involved in the conversation to have a URL or IP address.
