= NDR Method =

Medical intervention

The NDR Method is a registered trademark with the US Patent and Trademark Office for the non-surgical medical treatment of spinal discs. The NDR Method was developed by Dr. Eric M. Shapiro, D.C. of Charlotte, North Carolina, US. The treatment is only for use with patients whose medical histories and advanced radiological diagnostics (magnetic resonance imaging) have been performed and evaluated. The treatment is an advanced protocol for herniated, bulging and degenerative discs, based on the currently known and accepted anatomy of the spinal disc.
