= Michael Mealling =

Michael H. Mealling
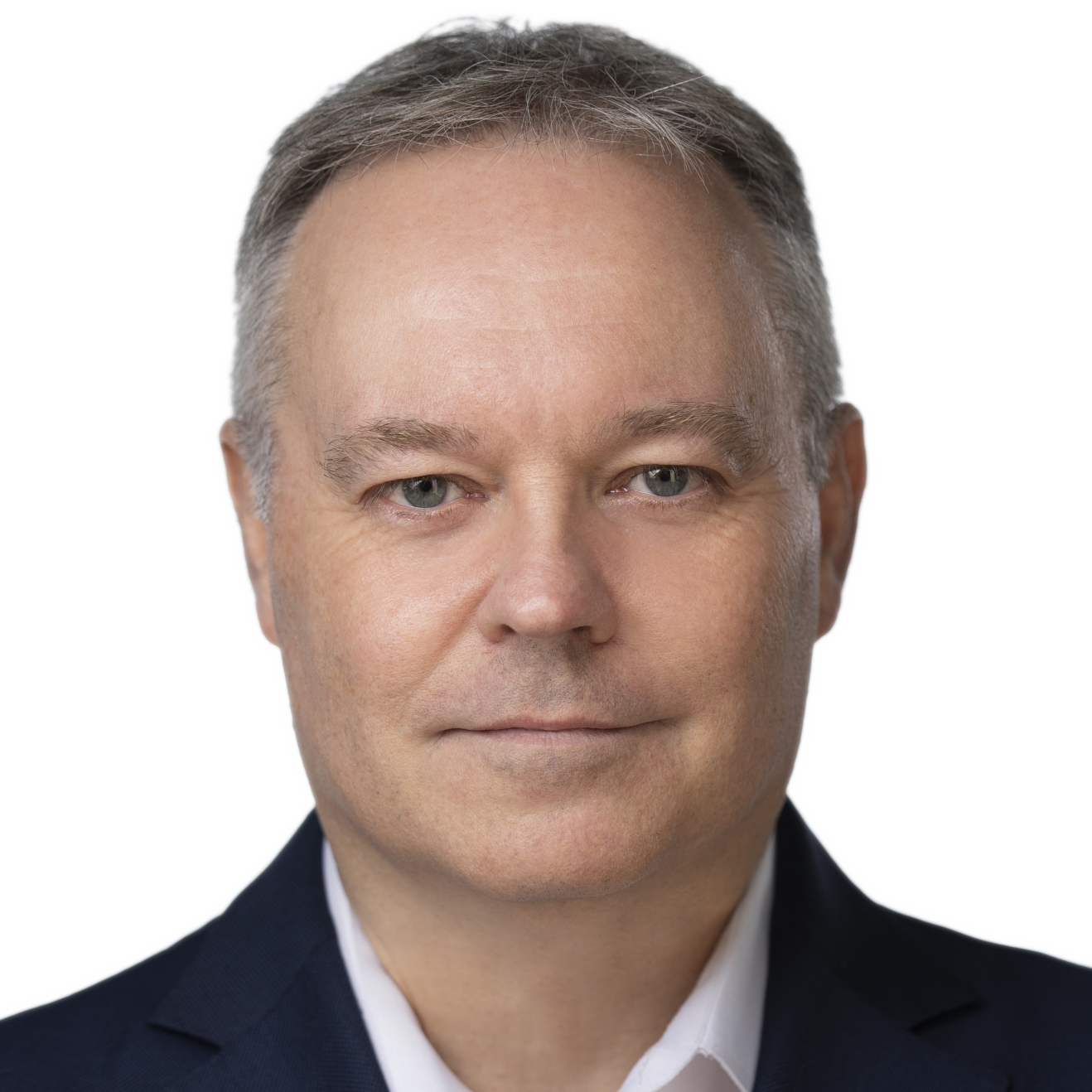
- Born: April 14, 1969 (age 55); Macon, Georgia, U.S.
- Occupation: Investor
- Employer: Starbridge Venture Capital
- Known for: Space industry startup advisor
- Title: COO, General Partner
- Website: www.rocketforge.org

Michael Mealling (born 1969) is co-founder of Pipefish Inc, and was the cofounder, Chief Financial Officer (CFO) and vice president of Business Development of Masten Space Systems, CEO of Refactored Networks, long time participant within the IETF, a Space Frontier Foundation Advocate, and a former director of the Moon Society. He operates a blog site called Rocketforge and has been interviewed twice on The Space Show and twice on SpaceVidcast.

== Early career ==
From 1990 through 1996, Michael Mealling worked at Georgia Tech in Atlanta, Georgia. While at Georgia Tech he created and ran much of what became Georgia Tech's web presence. He left Georgia Tech in 1996 to join Network Solutions as a developer and researcher. In 2000 VeriSign purchased Network Solutions and Michael Mealling became one of several R&D engineers within VeriSign. From 1991 through 2002 he was actively involved with the IETF where he published 22 RFCs.

Many of his industry efforts and activism have been driven by a desire maximize individual freedom. Over the past decade he has developed the idea that the only way to do this is by opening up new frontiers. Therefore, he spent several years with the Artemis Society, where he served for a time as president, and the Moon Society where he served on the board of directors. He is with Masten Space Systems where he hopes to be most effective in paving the way for settlement in space. He has maintained his space industry blog, Rocketforge, since 2003.

== Political career ==
Prior to his activism within the space industry, Michael Mealling was recruited into the Libertarian Party by the late Ron Crickenburger in 1989. He served for one election cycle on the Libertarian Party of Georgia state executive committee, but became discouraged after realizing the amounts of money required to make an impact and especially discouraged about the idea of repairing the United States. He embraces the philosophy of neo-libertarianism and is not actively participating in the Libertarian Party over differences on the war issue.

== Education ==
Michael graduated from the Georgia Institute of Technology in 2011 with a Masters in Business Administration MBA program, with a focus in Management of Technology.

== Bibliography ==
- RFC 5134 "A Uniform Resource Name Namespace for the EPCglobal Electronic Product Code (EPC) and Related Standards", M. Mealling, January 2008. INFORMATIONAL.
- RFC 4122 "A Universally Unique IDentifier (UUID) URN Namespace" P. Leach, M. Mealling, R. Salz. July 2005. PROPOSED STANDARD
- RFC 3761 "The E.164 to Uniform Resource Identifiers (URI) Dynamic Delegation Discovery System (DDDS) Application (ENUM)" P. Faltstrom, M. Mealling. April 2004. PROPOSED STANDARD
- RFC 3688 (BCP0081) "The IETF XML Registry" M. Mealling. January 2004.BEST CURRENT PRACTICE
- RFC 3622 "A Uniform Resource Name (URN) Namespace for the Liberty Alliance Project M. Mealling February 2004 INFORMATIONAL
- RFC 3553 (BCP0073) "An IETF URN Sub-namespace for Registered Protocol Parameters" M. Mealling, L. Masinter, T. Hardie, G. Klyne. June 2003. BEST CURRENT PRACTICE
- RFC 3405 (BCP0065) "Dynamic Delegation Discovery System (DDDS) Part Five: URI.ARPA Assignment Procedures" M. Mealling. October 2002. BEST CURRENT PRACTICE
- RFC 3404 "Dynamic Delegation Discovery System (DDDS) Part Four: The Uniform Resource Identifiers (URI)" M. Mealling, October 2002, PROPOSED STANDARD
- RFC 3403 "Dynamic Delegation Discovery System (DDDS) Part Three: The Domain Name System (DNS) Database" M. Mealling, October 2002, PROPOSED STANDARD
- RFC 3402 Dynamic Delegation Discovery System (DDDS) Part Two: The Algorithm" M. Mealling, October 2002, PROPOSED STANDARD
- RFC 3401 Dynamic Delegation Discovery System (DDDS) Part One: The Comprehensive DDDS" M. Mealling, October 2002, INFORMATIONAL
- RFC 3368 "The 'go' URI Scheme for the Common Name Resolution Protocol" M. Mealling, August 2002, PROPOSED STANDARD
- RFC 3367 "Common Name Resolution Protocol (CNRP)" N. Popp, M. Mealling, M. Moseley, August 2002, PROPOSED STANDARD
- RFC 3305 "Report from the Joint W3C/IETF URI Planning Interest Group: Uniform Resource Identifiers (URIs), URLs, and Uniform Resource Names (URNs): Clarifications and Recommendations" M. Mealling, Ed., R. Denenberg, Ed. August 2002 INFORMATIONAL
- RFC 3061 "A URN Namespace of Object Identifiers" M. Mealling February 2001, INFORMATIONAL
- RFC 3043 "The Network Solutions Personal Internet Name (PIN): A URN Namespace for People and Organizations" M. Mealling, January 2001, INFORMATIONAL
- RFC 2972 "Context and Goals for Common Name Resolution" N. Popp, M. Mealling, L. Masinter, K. Sollins, October 2000, INFORMATIONAL
- RFC 2915 "The Naming Authority Pointer (NAPTR) DNS Resource Record M. Mealling, R. Daniel September 2000, PROPOSED STANDARD
- RFC 2652 "MIME Object Definitions for the Common Indexing Protocol (CIP)" J. Allen, M. Mealling, August 1999, PROPOSED STANDARD
- RFC 2651 "The Architecture of the Common Indexing Protocol (CIP)" J. Allen, M. Mealling, August 1999, PROPOSED STANDARD
- RFC 2483 "URI Resolution Services Necessary for URN Resolution" M. Mealling, R. Daniel January 1999, EXPERIMENTAL
- RFC 2168 "Resolution of Uniform Resource Identifiers using the Domain Name System" R. Daniel, M. Mealling, June 1997 EXPERIMENTAL
