= Network Computing System =

Distributed network computing protocol

The Network Computing System (NCS) was an implementation of the Network Computing Architecture (NCA), launched in 1987. It comprised a set of tools for implementing distributed software applications, or distributed computing. The three principal components of NCS were a runtime environment for remote procedure calls, a network interface definition language (NIDL) compiler, and a location broker service. The location broker differentiated NCS from similar offerings, such as the rival Open Network Computing technology from Sun Microsystems, by permitting services to be distributed in a dynamic fashion and offering the possibility of "location independence".

The design and implementation of DCE/RPC, the remote procedure call mechanism in the Distributed Computing Environment, is based on NCA/NCS. In response to a request for proposals from the Open Software Foundation for distributed computing environments, NCS featured in the DEcorum proposal submitted by Apollo, by then incorporated as a division within Hewlett-Packard, along with IBM, Locus Computing, Transarc, Digital Equipment Corporation and Microsoft. It also was the first implementation of universally unique identifiers, these being employed by the location broker to identify objects in the distributed system.

== Bibliography ==
- Kong, Mike; et al. (Apollo Computer Inc.) (1987). Network Computing System Reference Manual. New Jersey: Prentice Hall. ISBN 0-13-617085-4.
- Zahn, Lisa; et al. (Apollo Computer Inc.) (1990). Network Computing Architecture. New Jersey: Prentice Hall. ISBN 0-13-611674-4.
- Lyons, Tom (1991). Network Computing System Tutorial. Hewlett-Packard Company, New Jersey: Prentice Hall. ISBN 0-13-617242-3
- P. Leach et al. (2005). RFC 4122 — A Universally Unique IDentifier (UUID) URN Namespace. Internet Engineering Task Force.
