= National Data Repository =

A National Data Repository (NDR) is a data bank that seeks to preserve and promote a country's natural resources data, particularly data related to the petroleum exploration and production (E&P) sector.

A National Data Repository is normally established by an entity that governs, controls and supports the exchange, capture, transference and distribution of E&P information, with the final target to provide the State with the tools and information to assure the growth, govern-ability, control, independence and sovereignty of the industry.

The two fundamental reasons for a country to establish an NDR are to preserve data generated inside the country by the industry, and to promote investments in the country by utilizing data to reduce the exploration, production, and transportation business risks.

Countries take different approaches towards preserving and promoting their natural resources data. The approach varies according to a country's natural resources policies, level of openness, and its attitude towards foreign investment.

== Data types ==
NDRs store a vast array of data related to a country's natural resources. This includes wells, well log data, well reports, core samples, seismic surveys, post-stack seismic, field data/tapes, seismic (acquisition/processing) reports, production data, geological maps and reports, license data and geological models.

== Funding models ==
Some NDRs are financed entirely by a country's government. Others are industry-funded. Still some are hybrid systems, funded in part by industry and government. NDRs typically charge fees for data requests and for data loading. The cost differs significantly between countries. In some cases an annual membership is charged to oil companies to store and access the data in the NDR.

== Standards body ==
Energistics is the global energy standards resource center for the upstream oil and gas industry.

Energistics National Data Repository Work Group: The standards body is Energistics.

=== Energistics-standards-directory ===
Global regulators of upstream oil and natural gas information, including seismic, drilling, production and reservoir data, formed the National Data Repository (NDR) Work Group in 2008 to collaborate on the development of data management standards and to assist emerging nations with hydrocarbon reserves to better collect, maintain and deliver oil and gas data to the public and to the industry.

Ten countries, led by the Netherlands, Norway and the United Kingdom, formed NDR to share best practices and to formalize the development and deployment of data management standards for regulatory agencies. The other countries involved in the NDR Work Group's formation are Australia, Canada, India, Kenya, New Zealand, South Africa and the United States.

Annual NDR Conference: Approximately every 18 months Energistics organizes a National Data Repository Conference. The purpose is to provide government and regulatory agencies from around the world an opportunity to attend a series of workshops dedicated to developing data exchange standards, improving communications with the oil and gas industry and learning data management techniques for natural resources information.

=== Society of Exploration Geophysicists and The International Oil and Gas Producers Association ===
The SEG is the custodian of the SEG standards which are used for the exchange, retention and release of seismic data. They are commonly used by National Data Repositories with the SEGD and SEGY being the field and processed exchange standards respectively.

== NDRs around the world ==
Click here to see a map of the NDRs around the world

Country	Name	Agency	Scope	Status	Purposes	Data types/volumes	Standards used	Funding	Website
Algeria	Banque de Données Nationale "BDN"	Agence Nationale pour la Valorisation des Ressources en Hydrocarbures (ALNAFT)	Onshore and Offshore Algeria	Ongoing project - agency created by new law in 2005	Custodian of all E&P data of the country	Cultural, Seismic 2D & 3D, Wells, Data Wells, Wells report, Production, Facilities, Economical and Fiscality, Interpretation, Physical assets index, Data drilling, Transcription, Vectorisation, digitalization	ASCII, SEGY, UKOOA, LAS, DLIS, LIS, PDS, BIT, RODE, PDF, TIF....etc.	Government funding/Agency revenue	http://www.alnaft.gov.dz/
Colombia	EPIS	Agencia Nacional de Hidrocarburos (ANH)	Onshore and offshore Colombia	Created originally for Ecopetrol and transferred to ANH when it was established in 2003. New system launched December 2009	Promote and preserve all the technical E&P information assets of the country	wells, surveys, licenses, seismic sections, well reports, maps	REST Web services	Government funding	http://www.anh.gov.co/
Canada	CNSOPB	Nova Scotia Offshore Petroleum Board – Geoscience Research Centre- Digital Data Management Centre (DMC)	Offshore Nova Scotia, Canada	Operational since 2007	To provide an effective & efficient system for the management of digital petroleum data, assist explorers in easily obtaining access to large volumes of data via the web, Data Preservation and Data Distribution	Wells, well log curves, well reports, cores and samples, field data/tapes, seismic (acquisition/processing) reports, production data, interpretative maps and reports	LAS, DLIS, SEGY	Funded 50/50 by the Federal and Provincial Governments with some funds from industry through cost recovery	http://www.cnsopb.ns.ca/
Australia	NOPDCR	NOPTA, Geoscience Australia, WA DMIRS	Commonwealth offshore Waters	Active	The NOPDCR is a collaboration between NOPTA, GA and WA DMIRS. Petroleum data is managed through agreed processes and authorised for public release on expiry of confidentiality periods. NOPIMS is an online discovery and delivery system to provide access to metadata and open-file well and survey information. Larger datasets are available directly through GA. .	Well and survey metadata, well completion reports, well logs and curves, cores and samples, thin sections and slides, seismic (acquisition/processing/reprocessing) reports, navigation and field data, interpretative maps and reports.		NOPTA provides funding for data management during the period of confidentiality through a cost recovery arrangement with industry. The Australian Government funds Geoscience Australia directly for management of the open-file collection.	http://nopta.gov.au http://ga.gov.au http://www.ga.gov.au/nopims
Western Australia	WAPIMS	Government of Western Australia		Active	WAPIMS is a petroleum, geothermal and minerals exploration database	Contains data on titles, wells, geophysical surveys and other petroleum exploration and production data submitted to DMP by the petroleum industry.			http://dmp.wa.gov.au
New South Wales		Government of New South Wales		Active	Various online geoscience databases to assist New South Wales including DIGS				http://www.dpi.nsw.gov.au/minerals http://digsopen.minerals.nsw.gov.au/
Northern Territory		Government of Northern Territory		Active	Various online geoscience databases to assist Northern Territories		Wells, well log curves, well reports, cores and samples, field data/tapes, seismic (acquisition/processing) reports, production data, interpretative maps and reports		http://www.nt.gov.au/d/Minerals_Energy/index.cfm?header=Petroleum
Queensland		Government of Queensland		Active	Various online geoscience databases to assist Queensland including Q-DEX		Wells, well log curves, well reports, cores and samples, field data/tapes, seismic (acquisition/processing) reports, production data, interpretative maps and reports		https://www.dnrm.qld.gov.au/
South Australia	SARIG	Government of South Australia		Active	Various online geoscience databases to assist South Australia such as PEP-SA		Wells, well log curves, well reports, cores and samples, field data/tapes, seismic (acquisition/processing) reports, production data, interpretative maps and reports		https://peps.sa.gov.au/home/ https://sarig.pir.sa.gov.au/
Tasmania					Various online geoscience databases to assist Tasmania		Active		http://www.mrt.tas.gov.au/portal/page?_pageid=35,1&_dad=portal&_schema=PORTAL
China	CNPC	Chinese National Petroleum Corporation			Various oil companies in China with CNPC the largest and parent of Petrochina				http://www.cnpc.com.cn/en/ http://www.petrochina.com.cn/ptr/ http://www.cnooc.com.cn/ http://english.sinopec.com/index.shtml
Russia		Sakhalin, DIGC RDC		Various oil companies in Russia the largest being Rosneft which is state owned					http://www.rosneft.com http://www.lukoil.com http://www.tnk-bp.com/en/ http://www.surgutneftegas.ru/ http://www.gazprom-neft.com/ http://www.tatneft.ru/wps/wcm/connect/tatneft/portal_rus/homepage/
Indonesia	Indonesia's National Data Centre (NDC) for petroleum, energy and minerals data	Agency for Research and Development in the Ministry of Energy and Mineral Resources of the Republic of Indonesia	Onshore & Offshore	In 1997 Indonesia established Migas Data Management (MDM) operated by PT. Patra Nusa Data (PND)	PND manages and promotes petroleum investment opportunities by compiling and value adding available petroleum data and information.				http://www.patranusa.com/
New Zealand	New Zealand Online Exploration Database	New Zealand Petroleum & Minerals, Ministry of Business Innovation & Employment	New Zealand onshore and offshore out to the outer continental shelf.	Opened to public in April 2007.	Data preservation, Investment facilitation, aid in monitoring regulatory compliance, maximise the return to the nation by informing public policy and business strategy.	Wells, well log curves, petroleum reports (includes wells and surveys), mineral reports, coal reports, cores and samples, seismic surveys, post-stack seismic, field data/tapes, seismic acquisition/processing reports, geophysical and geochemical data acquired in mineral and coal exploration (incorporated as enclosures to reports), VSP (incorporated as enclosures to reports), Seismic survey observer logs. GIS data and projects (minerals and coal). Estimated total NDR Size: 44 TB loaded, 3.0 TB staged for loading, 2.4 PB field data offline.	Closely follow Australian digital reporting standards. No naming standards for wells and surveys.	50% Government funding, 50% third party permit (license) fees paid by exploration companies.	https://data.nzpam.govt.nz
Jordan	NRA	Jordan Natural Resources Authority (NRA)	Onshore	Active	Online data room allows users to browse and select large data set quickly in a controlled and secure environment	Reserves land records, field data, maps, engineering, seismic data, geological studies and well files.			https://web.archive.org/web/20090307064657/http://www.jordan.gov.jo/
Angola		Sonangol	Offshore Angola	Active	Promotion, Organisation & Management of all Exploration & Production (E&P) Data of Angola	Wells, surveys, licenses, seismic sections, well reports, maps		Norad/OfD and NPD assistance	https://web.archive.org/web/20061117165438/http://www.sonangol.co.ao/
France	BEPH		French Territory		Interactive maps of French territory of oil data are available to Internet users which includes: Permits for petroleum exploration, seismic exploration, oil drilling (data, documents available)	Wells, Surveys, Licenses, Seismic Sections, Well Reports, Maps			
São Tomé and Príncipe	ANP-STP	National Petroleum Agency of São Tomé and Príncipe (ANP-STP)	Offshore					Norad/OfD and NPD assistance	http://www.anp-stp.gov.st
Tanzania	TPDC	Tanzania Petroleum Development Corp		Began in the early 1990s with Norwegian assistance	An E & P data archive centre	Geophysical survey data, Geological studies, Well drilling and completion reports, Cores and drill steam data		Norad/OfD and NPD assistance	http://www.tpdc-tz.com
Oman	OGDR	Department of Petroleum Concession, Ministry of Oil and Gas	Onshore & Offshore	Operational, tendering OGDR as a managed service (fully outsourced) June 2015	Preservation of E&P data, support concession promotion.	Well-related Data: Header, deviation, tops, field and processed logs, well documents. Seismic-related Data: Field and processed 2D/3D, Gravimag, VSP.	OGDR Data Submission Standard that uses industry standards where possible i.e. DLIS, SEG, UKOOA.	Government & concession holders.	http://www.mog.gov.om/english/tabid/309/Default.aspx
Netherlands	DINO	The Geological Survey of the Netherlands, a division of TNO	The Netherlands including offshore waters	Started in 2004. Currently BRO is being planned to succeed DINO.	To archive subsurface data of the Netherlands in one repository and provide easy access to the data to encourage multiple use of data.		WMS web services. DINO uses own naming conventions	100% Government funding	https://web.archive.org/web/20121102034234/http://www.nlog.nl/en/home/NLOGPortal.html
India	INDR	Directorate General of Hydrocarbons (DGH)		Active - scheduled operation from April 2015	Establishing national data archival, improving data quality and access for quality exploration and providing basis for long term energy policy formulation as well as support to OALP	Seismic, Wells, Well Logs, Cores, Scanned core images, Reports, production, Technical Reports		Government of India	http://www.ndrdgh.gov.in
Sri Lanka	PRDS	Ministry of Petroleum and Petroleum Resources Development		Active since 2009	The PRDS developed a website to disseminate petroleum data and information to public and to investors to assist promotion of offshore areas to attract investors for petroleum exploration	Wells, surveys, licenses, seismic sections, well reports, maps. Data historic and current, archived on different media (paper, mylar, magnetic tape)			http://www.prds-srilanka.com/data/onlineData.faces
Argentina	BDIH	Ministerio de Energía y Minería	On-Shore & Off-Shore	Active		Wells, surveys, seismic sections, well reports, maps, navigations. Data historic and current, archived on different media (paper, magnetic tape)	POSC, SGY, RODE, TIF, PDF	100% Government funding	http://www.bdih.com.ar
Peru	PeruPetro			Active					http://www.perupetro.com.pe
Kazakhstan		Ministry of Energy and Mineral Resources of the Republic of Kazakhstan (MEMR)		Active					http://www.petrodata.kz
Pakistan	PPEPDR	Directorate General Petroleum Concessions (DGPC)		Active since 2001		Repository contains more than 10 terabytes of secure petrotechnical data			http://www.ppepdr.net/
Nigeria	Department of Petroleum Resources			Active since December 2003.	Preserve, maintain the integrity and promote the National E&P data assets with improved quality, efficiency and accessibility in the most rapid, secure and reliable manner		International and PetroBank data management standards	Funded by Establishment Costs - one-off funding by Government and Running Costs - Subscription & Transaction Fees by Operators	
Turkey	PetroBank MDS	Turkish Petroleum Corporation (TPAO). It is NOC of Turkey.	36˚-42˚ northern parallel and the 26-45˚ eastern meridian.	Operational since 2007	Data assets preservation, easy access to assets, assets access controlling and auditing, consolidation of assets, national archive, central management of all assets, standardization of assets according to international standards and naming conventions, working with the most convenient assets.	Wells, Well log curves, well reports, cores and samples, seismic surveys, post-stack seismic, field data/tapes and seismic acquisition/processing reports.	International and PetroBank data management standards	Funded fully by the Turkish Petroleum Corporation. Service usage is free of charge.	http://www.tpao.gov.tr
Norway	DISKOS- Norwegian National Data Repository	Norwegian Petroleum Directorate (NPD) and DISKOS Group of oil companies	Norwegian continental shelf	Started in 1995	To ensure compliance with NPD reporting regulations for digital E&P data. To reduce data redundancy. To ensure that data is made generally available to the oil and gas industry and to society as a whole Long term preservation of data.	Wells, Well Log Curves, Seismic Surveys, field, pre-stack & post-stack seismic, seismic reports, production data (monthly allocated).Size of NDR estimated at more than 3 Petabytes.	SEG-D for seismic field data, SEG-Y for pre-stack and post-stack seismic data (currently only limited amounts of field and pre-stack data) All relevant well data standards such as LIS, DLIS, LAS, SPLA, SCAL etc. PDF and TIF are also used.	Costs are shared equally between all participating oil companies (around 50) in the Diskos consortium, including the NPD. In addition reporting companies pay to submit and download data. All Norwegian universities have free access to public data in Diskos. Non-oil companies can apply for Associated Membership, there are currently around 25 such members.	http://www.diskos.no/ http://www.npd.no
United Kingdom	UK National Data Repository	North Sea Transition Authority	UK Offshore Petroleum Licences and Infrastructure	Operational since Q1 2019 and relaunched in Q3 2021	Repository for current and historic reported information and samples Enables relevant persons to discharge their regulatory obligations to report petroleum related information and samples to the NSTA Enables the NSTA to disclose information to promote interest and investment in the UKCS and to promote reuse of petroleum licence information in support of the UK government's commitment to reach net zero emissions by 2050	Well log curves, deviation survey, test data and well reports; Field, Pre-stack and Post-stack seismic, Seismic reports, VSP; Licence Reports, Field Reports and studies. The re-launched service, in Q3 2021, included approximately 112 TB of licence data, including 97 TB pertaining to government funded regional 2D surveys (2015 and 2016), 10 TB of licensee reported post stack seismic and 5 TB of licensee reported wellbore information. A further approx 350 TB of licensee reported seismic field and pre-stack data was held offline on physical media. The NSTA intends to migrate the offline content to its cloud based NDR system and has projected the potential for holdings to increase to 4 Petabytes during the 5 years to 2026	NSTA's naming standards for wells (PON12) and surveys	The NSTA, including the NDR, is largely funded through a levy on offshore licensees	https://ndr.nstauthority.co.uk/ Information on the UK NDR: https://www.nstauthority.co.uk/data-centre/national-data-repository-ndr/
United Kingdom	UKOGL	UK Onshore Geophysical Library	UK onshore	In operation since 1994. Managed and operated by Lynx Information Systems Ltd on behalf of UKOGL.	Custodian of all UK onshore seismic data	Seismic, well tops, logs, cultural. Current archive size approx 6TB	SEGY, UKOOA, LAS, DLIS	Self-funded through data sales	http://www.ukogl.org.uk https://web.archive.org/web/20121005001335/http://maps.lynxinfo.co.uk/UKOGL_LIVE/map.html
Brazil	ANP	Agência Nacional do Petróleo (ANP)		BDEP formed in May 2000		Stores seismic, well log, post stack and pre-stack seismic data and potential field data(Grav/Mag)	ANP standards in place	Companies pay for accessing data and can pay yearly for a membership, with better prices for bigger amounts of data. Brazilian Universities can access data for free.	http://geo.anp.gov.br
Mexico	Ditep	Pemex		Established in 2002		Promotes and preserve all the technical E&P information assets of the country			http://www.pep.pemex.com/index.html
Israel		The Ministry of National Infrastructures		Exploratory					https://web.archive.org/web/20110925120857/http://www.mni.gov.il/mni/en-US/NaturalResources/OilandgasExploration/OilMaps
Cyprus	MCIT	Ministry of Commerce, Industry and Tourism-Energy Service	Offshore	Promotional	Responsible for granting licences for prospecting, exploration and exploitation of hydrocarbons				http://www.mcit.gov.cy/mcit/mcit.nsf/dmlhexploration_en/dmlhexploration_en?OpenDocument
South Africa		Petroleum Agency of South Africa		Active	Seismic data, Well data, Samples, reports and diagrams		Standards: Formats – SEGD, SEGY, LIS, LAS, PDF and TIFF, Media – 3480, 3590, DLT, 8mm Exabyte, DAT	From 2010 funded by Government	http://www.petroleumagencysa.com
Kenya	National Data Center (NDC)	National Oil Corporation of Kenya	Offshore and Onshore	Began in 2007, system implemented in 2010.	Digital data preservation, National archive, to implement integrated data management systems, provide easy access to quality-controlled data for internal and external customers, attract oil and gas exploration investment and to reduce data management costs.	Wells, well log curves, well reports, post-stack seismic, field data/tapes, seismic acquisition/processing reports, interpretive maps and reports.	Seismic data- SEGY. 3590 or 3592 data cartridges.	100% Government Funded	http://www.nockenya.co.ke/
United States	BOEMRE	Bureau of Ocean Energy, Management, Regulation and Enforcement (BOEMRE)	Gulf of Mexico	Has replaced the former Minerals Management Service (MMS)					http://www.gomr.boemre.gov/homepg/data_center.html
United States	NGRDS	National Geoscience Data Repository System (NGDRS)			NGRDS is a system of geoscience data repositories, providing information about their respective holdings accessible through a web-based supercatalog.		geologic, geophysical, and engineering data, maps, well logs, and samples	DOE has provided funds for the NGDRS since 1993	http://www.agiweb.org/ngdrs/index.html http://www.energy.gov/ http://www.agiweb.org/index.html List of Repositories in US listed also as directory http://www.agiweb.org/ngdrs/overview/datadirectory.html
Cambodia	CNPA	Cambodia National Petroleum Authority	Onshore & Offshore		Promotion and preservation of technical E&P information assets of the country			Norad/OfD and NPD assistance	http://www.cnpa-cambodia.com/
Afghanistan	MOM	Ministry of Mines of the Islamic Republic of Afghanistan (MoM)	Onshore		Promotion and preservation of technical E&P information assets of the country			Norad/OfD and NPD assistance	http://mom.gov.af/en/news/1637
Bangladesh	MOEMR	Hydrocarbon Unit, Ministry of Power, Energy and Mineral Resources (MOEMR)	Onshore & Offshore	Active and ongoing via HCU unit since 2005	A mini-data bank has established in the HCU to handle Production data, Resource data by using Database & GIS Software 2005 and promotion of technical E&P information assets of the country		Funded assistance	Norad/OfD and NPD assistance	http://www.hcu.org.bd/ http://www.petrobangla.org.bd http://www.bapex.com.bd
Ethiopia	MOME	Ministry of Mines and Energy Ethiopia		Active and ongoing	Promotion of technical E&P information assets of the country				https://web.archive.org/web/20110509171748/http://www.mome.gov.et/petroleum.html
Cameroon	SNH	SNH Cameroon		Active & Ongoing	Preservation and promotion of technical E&P information assets of the country				http://www.snh.cm
Malaysia	PIRI	Petronas		Yet to establish full NDR	Promotion and preservation of technical E&P information assets of the country				http://www.petronas.com.my
Spain	ATH				Online GIS databases to geophyscial information SIGEOF and ATH (Archivo de Hydrocarbures)				http://www.mityc.es/energia/petroleo/Exploracion/Paginas/Estadisticas.aspx http://hidrocarburos.mityc.es/ath/ http://www.igme.es/internet/sigeof/INICIOsiGEOF.htm
Morocco	ONHYM	Office National des Hydrocarbures et des Mines			Promotion and preservation of technical E&P information assets of the country				http://www.onhym.com
Madagascar	OMNIS				Promotion and preservation of technical E&P information assets of the country			Norad OfD and NPD assistance	
Sudan	PIC (Petroleum Information Center)	Ministry of Oil and Gas		Active since 2000	Preserve and promote E&P data, managing Oil Museum	Wells, well log, well reports, cores and samples, seismic (acquisition/processing) reports, production data, GIS			http://www.spc.gov.sd
Morocco	ONHYM	Office National des Hydrocarbures et des Mines			Promotion and preservation of technical E&P information assets of the country				http://www.onhym.com
Nicaragua	MEM			Active & ongoing				Norad OfD and NPD assistance	http://www.ine.gob.ni http://www.mem.gob.ni
Iraq	MoO	Ministry of Oil Republic of Iraq		Active and Ongoing since 2005	MoO establishing a centralized data base and NDR for Iraqi petroleum data and to ensure that data & information from petroleum activities is made available and attract more investors by promoting the petroleum activities	Well logs, Maps, Magnetic tapes, Core & cutting samples, Other geological and geophysical information		Norad/OfD and NPD assistance	https://web.archive.org/web/20170802182657/http://www.oil.gov.iq/
Latvia	LEGMC	Latvian Environment, Geology and Meteorology Centre	Offshore & Onshore		An E & P data archive centre which provides data available for purchase	Geological (well and seismic data, maps, reports etc.)			http://mapx.map.vgd.gov.lv/geo3/VGD_OIL_PAGE/index.htm
Albania	AKBN	National Agency of Natural Resources			Generates and promotes exploration opportunities in Albania, maintains archive of E & P data.				http://www.akbn.gov.al/index.php?ak=details&cid=5&lng=en
Uganda	PEPD	Petroleum Exploration & Production Dept (PEPD)	Onshore			Technical E & P data archive and information		Norad/Ofd assistance	http://www.statehouse.go.ug/government.php?catId=10 http://www.energyandminerals.go.ug
Zambia		Ministry of Mines and Minerals Development, Geological Survey Department (GSD)	Onshore	Active and ongoing		Technical E & P data archive and information - Technical Records Unit		Norad/Ofd & NPD assistance	http://www.zambiageosurvey.gov.zm/
Ivory Coast	MME	Ministry of Mines & Energy	Onshore & Offshore					Norad/Ofd and NPD assistance	https://web.archive.org/web/20110324075757/http://www.cotedivoirepr.ci/ http://www.petroci.ci/index.php?numlien=31
Romania		National Agency for Mineral Resources			Promotion and preservation of technical E&P information assets of the country				http://www.namr.ro/main_en.htm
Fiji	SOPAC	Mineral Resources Dept Fiji		Created as SOPAC Petroleum Data Bank a cooperative effort with Geoscience Australia	SOPAC acts as custodian and primary point for E & P data & information preserved on behalf of Pacific Island member nations	Well logs, Maps, Magnetic tapes, Core & cutting samples, Other geological and geophysical information		In part externally managed	http://www.mrd.gov.fj/gfiji/https://www.webcitation.org/6173sXdls?url=petroleum/petroleum.html http://www.ga.gov.au/energy/projects/pacific-islands-applied-geoscience-commission.html http://www.sopac.org/index.php/member-countries/fiji-islands
Papua New Guinea	SOPAC	Department of Petroleum and Energy		Created as SOPAC Petroleum Data Bank a cooperative effort with Geoscience Australia	SOPAC acts as custodian and primary point for E & P data & information preserved on behalf of Pacific Island member nations	Well logs, Maps, Magnetic tapes, Core & cutting samples, Other geological and geophysical information		Externally managed	http://www.petroleum.gov.pg http://www.petrominpng.com.pg/about.html http://www.ga.gov.au/energy/projects/pacific-islands-applied-geoscience-commission.html http://www.sopac.org/index.php/member-countries/papua-new-guinea
Solomon Islands	SOPAC			Created as SOPAC Petroleum Data Bank a cooperative effort with Geoscience Australia	SOPAC acts as custodian and primary point for E & P data & information preserved on behalf of Pacific Island member nations	Well logs, Maps, Magnetic tapes, Core & cutting samples, Other geological and geophysical information		Externally managed	http://www.ga.gov.au/energy/projects/pacific-islands-applied-geoscience-commission.html http://www.sopac.org/index.php/member-countries/solomon-islands
Tonga	SOPAC			Created as SOPAC Petroleum Data Bank a cooperative effort with Geoscience Australia	SOPAC acts as custodian and primary point for E & P data & information preserved on behalf of Pacific Island member nations	Well logs, Maps, Magnetic tapes, Core & cutting samples, Other geological and geophysical information		Externally managed	http://www.ga.gov.au/energy/projects/pacific-islands-applied-geoscience-commission.html http://www.sopac.org/index.php/member-countries/tonga
Vanuatu	SOPAC			Created as SOPAC Petroleum Data Bank a cooperative effort with Geoscience Australia	SOPAC acts as custodian and primary point for E & P data & information preserved on behalf of Pacific Island member nations	Well logs, Maps, Magnetic tapes, Core & cutting samples, Other geological and geophysical information		Externally managed	http://www.ga.gov.au/energy/projects/pacific-islands-applied-geoscience-commission.html http://www.sopac.org/index.php/member-countries/vanuatu
Guyana	GGMC	Guyana Geology and Mines Commission			Promotion and preservation of technical E&P information assets of the country				http://www.ggmc.gov.gy
Syria	SPC	Syrian Petroleum Company							http://www.spc-sy.com/en/aboutus/aboutus1_en.php
Liberia	NOCAL	National Oil Company of Liberia			Promotion and preservation of technical E&P information assets of the country				http://www.nocal-lr.com/
Chile	ENAP	National Oil Company of Chile			Promotion and preservation of technical E&P information assets of the country				http://www.enap.cl
Thailand	PTTEP	PTT Exploration and Production Public Company Ltd			Promotion and preservation of technical E&P information assets of the country				http://www.pttep.com/ http://www.pttep.com/en/index.aspx
Venezuela	PDVSA	Petroleos de Venezuela	Onshore & Offshore		Promotion and preservation of technical E&P information assets of the country				http://www.pdvsa.com/
Trinidad and Tobago		Trinidad Ministry of Energy and Energy Affairs			Promotion and preservation of technical E&P information assets of the country				http://www.energy.gov.tt/energy_industry.php?mid=31 http://www.petrotrin.com/Petrotrin2007/UpstreamBusiness.htm
Mozambique	NAPD			Established in 1999 under NORAD support	To ensure that data & information from petroleum activities is made available and attract more investors by promoting the petroleum activities	Well logs, Maps, Magnetic tapes, Core & cutting samples, Other geological and geophysical information		National Budget and INP funds	https://web.archive.org/web/20100903183715/http://www.inp.gov.mz/
Denmark		Danish Energy Agency			Online GIS service for wells and license data				http://www.ens.dk/EN-US/OILANDGAS/Sider/Oilandgas.aspx
Dominican Republic		Directorate of Hydrocarbons							http://www.dgm.gov.do/sdhidrocarburo/index.html
Equatorial Guinea					Exploration databank for Equatorial Guinea				http://www.equatorialoil.com http://www.equatorialoil.com/database.html
Faroe Islands	Jardfeingi	Jardfeingi Faorese Earth and Energy Directorate			Promotion of exploration and licensing rounds				http://www.jardfeingi.fo
Philippines	PNOC	Philippine National Oil Company			Promotion of exploration and licensing rounds				http://www.pnoc.com.ph http://www.pnoc-ec.com.ph/business.php?id=2
Greenland	GreenPetroData	MMR- Ministry of Mineral Resources			Web and GIS system providing access to all Released Well and Geophysical data.				https://www.greenpetrodata.gl/ http://govmin.gl/
Iceland	Iceland Continental Shelf Portal (ICSP)	Orkustofnunn - National Energy Authority	Offshore	The Iceland Continental Shelf Portal (ICSP)	Provides access to information about data pertaining to the Icelandic Continental Shelf, in particular initially to the northern Dreki Area to assist with licensing round promotion				http://www.os.is http://www.nea.is/oil-and-gas-exploration/
Myanmar	MOGE	Myanmar Oil & Gas Enterprise							http://www.energy.gov.mm/upstreampetroleumsubsector.htm
Yemen	PEPA	Petroleum Exploration and Production Authority (PEPA)							http://www.pepa.com.ye/
Tunisia	ETAP	Enterprise Tunisienne D’Activities Petrolieres			Promotion and preservation of technical E&P information assets of the country				http://www.etap.com.tn
Gabon	DGH	Direction Generale des Hydrocarbures (DGH)							http://www.gabon-industriel.com/les-actions/energie/petrole
Congo	SNPC	Société Nationale des pétroles du Congo							
Mali	Aurep	Autorite pour la Promotion de la Recherce des Petroliere au Mali			Databank service managing the geological and geophysical data relative to petroleum research.				http://www.aurep.org http://www.aurep.org/htmlpages/mali.html
Guatemala	MEM	Dirección General de Hidrocarbures			Online maps and images of wells, seismic, licenses, protected areas, exploration and production				http://www.mem.gob.gt/Portal/home.aspx http://www.mem.gob.gt/Portal/Home.aspx?secid=25
Iran	NIOC	National Oil Company of Iran							http://www.nioc.ir
Libya	NOC	NOC Libya			Virtual data room in place for promotion of exploration and exploitation of hydrocarbons				
United Arab Emirates	ADNOC	Abu Dhabi National Oil Company							https://web.archive.org/web/20080430165041/http://www.adnoc.ae/
Qatar		Qatar Petroleum							http://www.qp.com.qa
South Korea	KNOC	Korea National Petroleum Corporation							http://www.knoc.co.kr
Seychelles	SNOC	Seychelles National Oil Company							
Saudi Arabia		Saudi Aramco							http://www.saudiaramco.com
Belarus									http://geologiya.org/index.php?categoryid=14 http://minpriroda.by/ru/napravlenia/minsyrbaza
Timor-Leste	LAFAEK	Autoridade Nacional do Petróleo			Online GIS with wells and licences			Norad/OfD assistance	http://www.anp-tl.org/webs/anptlweb.nsf/pgMaps

== See also ==
- Norwegian Petroleum Directorate
- Oil and Gas Authority
- Oil and gas industry in the United Kingdom
- Petroleum exploration in Guyana
- Professional Petroleum Data Management Association (PPDM)
