= Distributed Computing Environment =

Client/server computer framework

The Distributed Computing Environment (DCE) is a software system developed in the early 1990s from the work of the Open Software Foundation (OSF), a consortium founded in 1988 that included Apollo Computer (part of Hewlett-Packard from 1989), IBM, Digital Equipment Corporation, and others. The DCE supplies a framework and a toolkit for developing client/server applications. The framework includes:

- a remote procedure call (RPC) mechanism known as DCE/RPC
- a naming (directory) service
- a time service
- an authentication service
- a distributed file system (DFS) known as DCE/DFS

The DCE did not achieve commercial success.

As of 1995, all major computer hardware vendors had an implementation of DCE, seen as an advantage compared to alternatives like CORBA which all had more limited support.

== History ==
As part of the formation of OSF, various members contributed many of their ongoing research projects as well as their commercial products. For example, HP/Apollo contributed its Network Computing Environment (NCS) and CMA Threads products. Siemens Nixdorf contributed its X.500 server and ASN/1 compiler tools. At the time, network computing was quite popular, and many of the companies involved were working on similar RPC-based systems. By integrating security, RPC and other distributed services on a single distributed computing environment, OSF could offer a major advantage over SVR4, allowing any DCE-supporting system (namely OSF/1) to interoperate in a larger network.

The DCE "request for technology" was issued by the OSF in 1989. The first OSF DCE vendor product came out in 1992.

The DCE system was, to a large degree, based on independent developments made by each of the partners. DCE/RPC was derived from the Network Computing System (NCS) created at Apollo Computer. The naming service was derived from work done at Digital. DCE/DFS was based on the Andrew File System (AFS) originally developed at Carnegie Mellon University. The authentication system was based on Kerberos. By combining these features, DCE offers a fairly complete system for network computing. Any machine on the network can authenticate its users, gain access to resources, and call them remotely using a single integrated API.

The rise of the Internet, Java and web services stole much of DCE's mindshare through the mid-to-late 1990s, and competing systems such as CORBA appeared as well.

One of the major uses of DCE today is Microsoft's DCOM and ODBC systems, which use DCE/RPC (in MSRPC) as their network transport layer.

OSF and its projects eventually became part of The Open Group, which released DCE 1.2.2 under a free software license (the LGPL) on 12 January 2005.

DCE 1.1 was available much earlier under the OSF BSD license, and resulted in FreeDCE being available since 2000. FreeDCE contains an implementation of DCOM.

One of the major systems built on top of DCE was Encina, developed by Transarc (later acquired by IBM). IBM used Encina as a foundation to port its primary mainframe transaction processing system (CICS) to non-mainframe platforms, as IBM TXSeries. (However, later versions of TXSeries have removed the Encina component.)

== Architecture ==
DCE is intended to support high availability systems: when a server does not respond (because of server failure or communications failure), clients can be constructed to automatically use a replica of that server instead.

The largest unit of management in DCE is a cell. The highest privileges within a cell are assigned to a role called cell administrator, normally assigned to the "user" cell_admin. Multiple cells can be configured to communicate and share resources with each other. All principals from external cells are treated as "foreign" users and privileges can be awarded or removed accordingly. In addition to this, specific users or groups can be assigned privileges on any DCE resource, something which is not possible with the traditional UNIX filesystem, which lacks ACL's.

Major components of DCE within every cell are:

1. The Security Server that is responsible for authentication
2. The Cell Directory Server (CDS) that is the repository of resources and ACLs and
3. The Distributed Time Server that provides an accurate clock for proper functioning of the entire cell

Modern DCE implementations such as IBM's are fully capable of interoperating with Kerberos as the security server, LDAP for the CDS and the Network Time Protocol implementations for the time server.

DCE/DFS is a DCE-based application which provides a distributed filesystem on DCE. DCE/DFS can support replicas of a fileset (the DCE/DFS equivalent of a filesystem) on multiple DFS servers - there is one read-write copy and zero or more read only copies. Replication is supported between the read-write and the read-only copies. In addition, DCE/DFS also supports what are called "backup" filesets, which if defined for a fileset are capable of storing a version of the fileset as it was prior to the last replication.

DCE/DFS is believed to be the world's only distributed filesystem that correctly implements the full POSIX filesystem semantics, including byte range locking.

DCE/DFS was sufficiently reliable and stable to be utilised by IBM to run the back-end filesystem for the 1996 Olympics web site, seamlessly and automatically distributed and edited worldwide in different time zones.
