= Wireless Application Protocol Bitmap Format =

File format

Wireless Bitmap
- Filename extension: .wbmp
- Internet media type: image/vnd.wap.wbmp
- Developed by: WAP Forum
- Type of format: Image file formats

Wireless Application Protocol Bitmap Format (shortened to Wireless Bitmap and with file extension .wbmp) is a raster image file format optimized for early mobile computing devices.

WBMP images are monochrome black and white binary images in which a black pixel is denoted by 0 and a white pixel is denoted by 1. The simple pixel encoding and the small size of the file header mean that the file size is kept to a minimum, enabling fast transmission on slow networks.

== File format ==
Field name	Field type	Size (in bytes)	Purpose
Type	uintvar	variable	Type of the image, and is 0 for monochrome bitmaps.
Fixed header	byte	1	Reserved. Always 0.
Width	uintvar	variable	Width of the image in pixels.
Height	uintvar	variable	Height of the image in pixels.
Data	byte array	variable	Data bytes arranged in rows – one bit per pixel. A black pixel is denoted by 0 and a white pixel is denoted by 1. The pixel order within a byte is MLP (most left pixel) = MSB (most significant bit). Where the row length is not divisible by 8, the row is 0-padded to the byte boundary.
