= GeneralizedTime =

Time format

GeneralizedTime is an ASN.1 notation time type represented as a string. It encodes the calendar date and time of day, optionally including fractional seconds and an optional time zone offset. While its structure is conceptually aligned with ISO 8601, the format is compact and does not use ISO 8601’s separators.

In contrast to the UTCTime class of ASN.1 the GeneralizedTime uses a four-digit representation of the year to avoid possible ambiguity. Another difference is the possibility to encode time information of any wanted precision via the fractional seconds element.

Examples from ITU-T X.680:

"19851106210627.3"
local time 6 minutes, 27.3 seconds after 9 pm on 6 November 1985.

"19851106210627.3Z"
coordinated universal time as above.

"19851106210627.3-0500"
local time as in the first example, with local time 5 hours retarded in relation to coordinated universal time.

ASN.1 also defines a DateAndTime time format widely used in SNMP, that includes separator characters and does not pad the fields (e.g., "1985-11-6,21:6:27.3,-5:0").

== See also ==
- The X.690 encoding standard for ASN.1
