= PrintableString =

Restricted character string type

A PrintableString is a restricted character string type in the ASN.1 notation. It is used to describe data that consists only of a specific printable subset of the ASCII character set.

According to the ASN.1 Specification of basic notation, the character set of PrintableString can be expressed as:

Name	Graphic	ASCII Code (DEC)	ASCII Code (HEX)	Type
Latin capital letters	A,B, ... Z	65 - 90	41 - 5A	Letter
Latin small letters	a,b, ... z	97 - 122	61 - 7A	Letter
Numbers	0,1, ... 9	48 - 57	30 - 39	Number
SPACE	(space)	32	20	Whitespace
APOSTROPHE	'	39	27	Punctuation
LEFT PARENTHESIS	(	40	28	Punctuation
RIGHT PARENTHESIS	)	41	29	Punctuation
PLUS SIGN	+	43	2B	Punctuation
COMMA	,	44	2C	Punctuation
HYPHEN-MINUS	-	45	2D	Punctuation
FULL STOP	.	46	2E	Punctuation
SOLIDUS	/	47	2F	Punctuation
COLON	:	58	3A	Punctuation
EQUALS SIGN	=	61	3D	Punctuation
QUESTION MARK	?	63	3F	Punctuation

The entire character set contains precisely 74 characters. Namely: 52 letters, 10 digits, 1 whitespace and 11 punctuation character. All of these characters, including space, meet the C character classification of "printable character".

== Practical limitations ==
The PrintableString definition does not include the at sign (@) or ampersand (&). Both of these are legal characters in email addresses.

This sometimes causes problems for naive implementers who attempt to put an SMTP email address into an X.509 digital certificate Distinguished Name.

The PrintableString definition does not include asterisk (*) which means it must not be used to represent a wildcard in an X.509 digital certificate Distinguished Name.

== Character set ==
The following table shows the PrintableString character set. Each character is shown with the code point of its Unicode equivalent.

PrintableString character set
	0	1	2	3	4	5	6	7	8	9	A	B	C	D	E	F
0x	NUL	SOH	STX	ETX	EOT	ENQ	ACK	BEL	BS	HT	LF	VT	FF	CR	SO	SI
1x	DLE	DC1	DC2	DC3	DC4	NAK	SYN	ETB	CAN	EM	SUB	ESC	FS	GS	RS	US
2x	SP	!	"	#	$	%	&	'	(	)	*	+	,	-	.	/
3x	0	1	2	3	4	5	6	7	8	9	:	;	<	=	>	?
4x	@	A	B	C	D	E	F	G	H	I	J	K	L	M	N	O
5x	P	Q	R	S	T	U	V	W	X	Y	Z	[	\	]		_
6x	`	a	b	c	d	e	f	g	h	i	j	k	l	m	n	o
7x	p	q	r	s	t	u	v	w	x	y	z	{	|	}	~	DEL

Undefined, showing instead the ASCII character at that location)

== See also ==
- The X.690 encoding standard for ASN.1
- IA5String, a superset of PrintableString
