= ISO/IEC 19794-5 =

Biometric data standard

ISO/IEC 19794 Information technology—Biometric data interchange formats—Part 5: Face image data, or ISO/IEC 19794-5 for short, is the fifth of 8 parts of the ISO/IEC standard ISO/IEC 19794, published in 2005, which describes interchange formats for several types of biometric data. ISO/IEC 19794-5 defines specifically a standard scheme for codifying data describing human faces within a CBEFF-compliant data structure, for use in facial recognition systems. Modern biometric passport photos should comply with this standard. Many organizations and have already started enforcing its directives, and several software applications have been created to automatically test compliance to the specifications.

The standard is intended to allow computer analysis of face images for automated face identification and authentication, as well as human identification of distinctive facial features and human verification of computer identification results.
