= IA5 =

IA5 or similar may refer to:

- Iowa Highway 5, a highway in the southern part of the U.S. state of Iowa
- Iowa's 5th congressional district, a congressional district in the U.S. state of Iowa
- Institutional Act Number Five, a Brazilian law sometimes abbreviated as IA-5 or AI-5
- International Reference Alphabet, formerly International Alphabet No. 5, a character set encoding defined by the International Telecommunication Union
- Galaxy 25, formerly Intelsat Americas 5, a medium-powered communications satellite
