= TTCN-3 =

Testing language for telecommunication systems

TTCN-3 (Testing and Test Control Notation version 3) is a strongly typed testing language used in conformance testing of communicating systems. TTCN-3 is written by ETSI in the ES 201 873 series, and standardized by ITU-T in the Z.160 Series.

TTCN-3 has its own data types and can be combined with ASN.1, IDL, and XML type definitions.

== Standard organization ==
The ITU-T TTCN-3 standard is part of the Z Series and is organized in several parts:

- Z.161 – Core Language: defines the core textual notation
- Z.162 – Tabular presentation format (TFT): a way to present tests in a tabular format
- Z.163 – Graphical presentation format (GFT): a way to present tests graphically with a representation similar to MSC
- Z.164 – Operational semantics: defines how TTCN-3 is executed
- Z.165 – TRI: defines the API provided and required with a tester
- Z.166 – TCI: defines the API provided and required with a test controller
- Z.167 – ASN.1: defines how to use ASN.1 data types in a TTCN-3 test suite
- Z.168 – IDL to TTCN-3 mapping
- Z.169 – Using XML schema with TTCN-3

== Language organization ==
Module
The top-level container in a test suite is a module. It is usually mapped to a single file.
Component
An execution entity. A test case or a function is executed on a component.
Port
Components communicate with each other or with the system under test through ports that are mapped to each other.
Test case
A sequence of sends and receives. When a message is sent to the SUT (System under test), several possible replies can be received.
Alternative
Since a test case is a sequence of stimuli followed by a set of possible responses, the notation includes alternatives. It is a compact way to list all possible alternatives in a scenario.
Template
Defines parameter values when sending or verifies parameter values when receiving. The template construct allows complex verifications in a single statement to keep the test case legible.
Verdict
The result of a test case execution. It has five possible values: none, pass, inconc, fail, or error.

== Applications ==
TTCN-3 has been used to define conformance test suites for SIP, WiMAX, and DSRC standard protocols.

The Open Mobile Alliance adopted a strategy in 2008 of using TTCN-3 for translating test cases in enabler test specifications into an executable representation.

The AUTOSAR project promoted the use of TTCN-3 within the automotive industry.

The 3GPP project promoted the use of TTCN-3 within the mobile industry.

== Architecture ==
When executing, the test system architecture is organized as follows:

- TE (TTCN-3 Executable): The executable form of the test suite.
- TRI (TTCN-3 Runtime Interface): The interface between the TE and the SUT. It is divided into two parts:
  - SA: System Adaptor
  - PA: Platform Adaptor
- TCI (TTCN-3 Control Interfaces): The interface to control test execution. It is divided into:
  - TM: Test Management
  - TL: Test Logging
  - CD: Coding and Decoding
  - CH: Component Handling

== Example code ==
The following is a TTCN-3 example alongside a graphical representation of the scenario as a Message Sequence Chart (MSC).

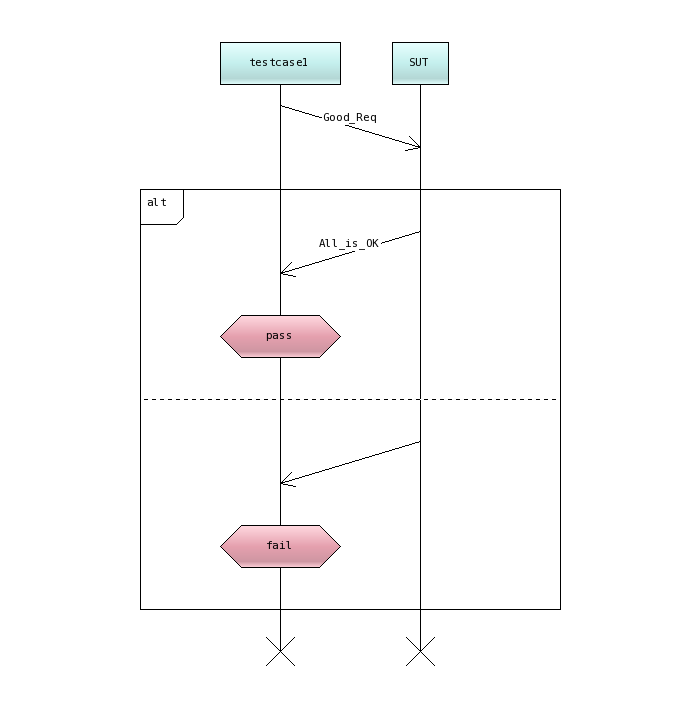
MSC representation of a basic TTCN-3 scenario.

module TestSystem {

// Define a subtype of integer
type integer myNewType (0..50)

// Declare Request struct type with 2 fields
type record Request {
  myNewType param1,
  charstring param2
}

// Declare Answer struct type with one field
type record Answer {
  myNewType param1
}

// Declare a message-based communication port
type port cEnv_type message {
  out Request;
  in Answer;
}

// Declare the component on which the test case will run
type component sSystem {
  port cEnv_type cEnv;
}

// The templates define outgoing parameter values
// and verify incoming parameter values
template Request Good_Req := {param1 := 42, param2 := "hello !" };
template Answer All_is_OK := {param1 := 0};

// Define testcase1 that will run on sSystem component
testcase testcase1() runs on sSystem
{
  // Send Request message with (42, "hello !") as parameters
  cEnv.send(Good_Req);
  // An alternative for the 2 possible answers
  alt
    {
    // Do we receive Answer with 0 as parameter
    []cEnv.receive(All_is_OK)
      {
      // Pass verdict !
      setverdict(pass)
      }
    // Or do we receive something else
    []cEnv.receive
      {
      // Fail verdict
      setverdict(fail)
      }
    }
}

// Control part chains test cases execution automatically
control {
  var verdicttype verdict1;
  verdict1 := execute(testcase1());
}
}

== See also ==
- ASN.1
- ETSI
- TTCN
