= Lightweight Presentation Protocol =

Lightweight Presentation Protocol (LPP) is a protocol used to provide ISO presentation services on top of TCP/IP based protocol stacks. It is defined in RFC 1085. The Lightweight Presentation Protocol describes an approach for providing "streamlined" support of OSI model-conforming application services on top of TCP/IP-based network for some constrained environments. It was initially derived from a requirement to run the ISO Common Management Information Protocol (CMIP) in TCP/IP-based networks.
