= LEB128 =

Efficient variable-length integer encoding

LEB128 or Little Endian Base 128 is a variable-length code compression used to store arbitrarily large integers in a small number of bytes. LEB128 is used in the DWARF debug file format and the WebAssembly binary encoding for all integer literals.

== Encoding format ==
LEB128 format is very similar to the variable-length quantity (VLQ) format used in MIDI and ASN.1; the primary difference is that LEB128 is little-endian whereas variable-length quantities are big-endian. Both allow small numbers to be stored in a single byte, while also allowing encoding of arbitrarily long numbers. There are two versions of LEB128: unsigned LEB128 and signed LEB128. The decoder must know whether the encoded value is unsigned LEB128 or signed LEB128.

=== Unsigned LEB128 ===
To encode an unsigned number using unsigned LEB128 (ULEB128) first represent the number in binary. Then zero extend the number up to a multiple of seven bits (such that if the number is non-zero, the most significant seven bits are not all 0). Break the number up into groups of seven bits. Output one encoded byte for each seven bit group, from least significant to most significant group. Each byte will have the group in its seven least significant bits. Set the most significant bit on each byte except the last byte. The number zero is usually encoded as a single byte 0x00. WebAssembly allows alternate encodings of zero (0x80 0x00, 0x80 0x80 0x00, ...).

As an example, here is how the unsigned number 624485 gets encoded:

MSB ------------------ LSB
      10011000011101100101  In raw binary
     010011000011101100101  Padded to a multiple of 7 bits
 0100110  0001110  1100101  Split into 7-bit groups
00100110 10001110 11100101  Add high 1 bits on all but last (most significant) group to form bytes
    0x26     0x8E     0xE5  In hexadecimal

→ 0xE5 0x8E 0x26            Output stream (LSB to MSB)

Unsigned LEB128 and VLQ (variable-length quantity) both compress any given integer into not only the same number of bits, but exactly the same bits—the two formats differ only in exactly how those bits are arranged.

=== Signed LEB128 ===
A signed number is represented similarly: Starting with an $N$-bit two's complement representation, where $N$ is a multiple of 7, the number is broken into groups as for the unsigned encoding.

For example, the signed number -123456 is encoded as 0xC0 0xBB 0x78:

MSB ------------------ LSB
         11110001001000000  Binary encoding of 123456 (begin with unsigned)
     000011110001001000000  As a 21-bit number
     111100001110110111111  Negating all bits (ones' complement)
     111100001110111000000  Adding one (two's complement)
 1111000  0111011  1000000  Split into 7-bit groups
01111000 10111011 11000000  Add high 1 bits on all but last (most significant) group to form bytes
    0x78     0xBB     0xC0  In hexadecimal

→ 0xC0 0xBB 0x78            Output stream (LSB to MSB)

== Fast decoding ==
A straightforward scalar implementation of LEB128 decoding is fairly slow, even more so on modern hardware where branch misprediction is relatively expensive. A series of papers presents SIMD techniques for accelerating decoding (it is called VByte in these papers, but is another name for the same encoding). The "Vectorized VByte Decoding" paper presented "Masked VByte", which demonstrated speeds of 650–2700 million integers per second on commodity Haswell hardware, depending on encoding density.

A followup paper presented a variant encoding, "Stream VByte: Faster Byte Oriented Integer Compression", which increased speeds to over 4 billion integers per second. This stream encoding separates the control stream from the encoded data, so is not binary compatible with LEB128.

== C-like pseudocode ==
=== Encode unsigned integer ===
do {
  byte = value & 0x7f; /* low-order 7 bits of value */
  value >>= 7;
  if (value != 0) /* more bytes to come */
    byte |= 0x80; /* set high-order bit of byte */
  emit(byte);
} while (value != 0);

=== Encode signed integer ===
more = 1;
negative = (value < 0);

/* the size in bits of the variable "value", e.g., 64 if value's type is int64_t */
size = sizeof(value) * CHAR_BITS; /* no. of bits in signed integer */

while (more) {
  byte = value & 0x7f; /* low-order 7 bits of value */
  value >>= 7;
  /* the following is only necessary if the implementation of >>= uses a
     logical shift rather than an arithmetic shift for a signed left operand
     this does not happen on most programming languages if "value" is in a signed type to begin with */
  if (negative)
    value |= (~0 << (size - 7)); /* sign extend */

  /* sign bit of byte is second high-order bit (0x40) */
  sign_bit = byte & 0x40;
  if ((value == 0 && sign_bit == 0) || (value == -1 && sign_bit != 0))
    more = 0;
  else
    byte |= 0x80; /* set high-order bit of byte */
  emit(byte);
}

=== Decode unsigned integer ===
result = 0;
shift = 0;
unsigned char byte;
do {
  byte = get_next_byte_in_input();
  result |= (byte & 0x7f) << shift; /* low-order 7 bits of byte */
  shift += 7;
} while ((byte & 0x80) != 0); /* get high-order bit of byte */

=== Decode signed integer ===
result = 0;
shift = 0;

/* the size in bits of the result variable, e.g., 64 if result's type is int64_t */
size = sizeof(result) * CHAR_BITS; /* no. of bits in signed integer */

/* will be assigned inside the do-while loop, but referenced afterwards */
unsigned char byte;

do {
  byte = get_next_byte_in_input();
  result |= (byte & 0x7f) << shift; /* low-order 7 bits of byte */
  shift += 7;
} while ((byte & 0x80) != 0); /* get high-order bit of byte */

/* sign bit of byte is second high-order bit (0x40) */
if ((shift < size) && ((byte & 0x40) != 0))
  /* sign extend */
  result |= (~0 << shift);

== JavaScript code ==
=== Encode signed BigInt ===
const encodeSignedLeb128FromBigInt = (value) => {
  value = BigInt(value);
  const result = [];
  while (true) {
    const byte_ = Number(value & 0x7fn);
    value >>= 7n;
    if (
      (value === 0n && (byte_ & 0x40) === 0) ||
      (value === -1n && (byte_ & 0x40) !== 0)
    ) {
      result.push(byte_);
      return result;
    }
    result.push(byte_ | 0x80);
  }
};

=== Decode signed BigInt ===
const decodeSignedBigInt = (input) => {
  let result = 0n;
  let shift = 0;
  while (true) {
    const byte = input.shift();
    result |= BigInt((byte & 0x7f) << shift);
    shift += 7;
    if ((byte & 0x80) === 0) {
      // "sign-extending" does not apply to bigint because it has no fixed size
      // instead, we work by handling it as a two's complement of "shift" bits long,
      // which is provided by BigInt.asIntN
      return BigInt.asIntN(shift, result);
    }
  }
};

== Uses ==
- The Android project uses LEB128 in its Dalvik Executable Format (.dex) file format.
- Compressing tables in Hewlett-Packard IA-64 exception handling.
- The DWARF file format uses both unsigned and signed LEB128 encoding for various fields.
- LLVM, in its Coverage Mapping Format LLVM's implementation of LEB128 encoding and decoding is useful alongside the pseudocode above.
- .NET supports a "7-bit encoded int" format in the BinaryReader and BinaryWriter classes. When writing a string to a BinaryWriter, the string length is encoded with this method.
- Minecraft uses LEB128 in its protocol for measuring lengths of data within packets.
- The mpatrol debugging tool uses LEB128 in its tracing file format.
- osu! uses LEB128 in its osu! replay (.osr) format.
- W3C Efficient XML Interchange (EXI) represents unsigned integers using LEB128, in exactly the same way as described here.
- WebAssembly, in its portable binary encoding of the modules
- In the xz file format

== Related encodings ==
- Dlugosz' Variable-Length Integer Encoding (original) uses multiples of 7 bits for the first three size breaks, but after that the increments vary. It also puts all the prefix bits at the beginning of the word, instead of at the beginning of each byte.
- Human interface device report descriptor bytes use a byte-count bitfield of 2 bits to encode the size of the following integer of zero, one, two, or four bytes, always little endian. Signedness, i.e. whether to expand the shortened integer with sign or not, depends on the descriptor type.
- The LLVM bitcode file format uses a similar technique except that the value is broken into groups of bits of context-dependent size, with the highest bit indicating a continuation, instead of a fixed 7 bits.
- Protocol Buffers (Protobuf) uses the same encoding for unsigned integers, but encode signed integers by prepending the sign as the least significant bit of the first byte.
- ASN.1 BER, DER Encode values of each ASN.1 type as a string of eight-bit octets

== See also ==
- The DWARF debugging file format
- UTF-7
