= X.690 =

Standard specifying ASN.1 encoding formats

X.690 is an ITU-T standard specifying several ASN.1 encoding formats:

- Basic Encoding Rules (BER)
- Canonical Encoding Rules (CER)
- Distinguished Encoding Rules (DER)

The Basic Encoding Rules (BER) were the original rules laid out by the ASN.1 standard for encoding data into a binary format. The rules, collectively referred to as a transfer syntax in ASN.1 parlance, specify the exact octets (8-bit bytes) used to encode data.

X.680 defines a syntax for declaring data types, for example: Booleans, numbers, strings, and compound structures. Each type definition also includes an identifying number. X.680 defines several primitive data types, for example: BooleanType, IntegerType, OctetStringType. (ASN.1 also provides for constructed types built from other types.) Types are associated with a class. For example, the primitive types are part of the universal class. The three other classes (application, private, and context-specific) are essentially different scopes to support customization for specific applications. Combined, the class and type form a tag, which therefore corresponds to a unique data definition. X.690 includes rules for encoding those tags, data values (content), and the lengths of that encoded data.

BER, along with two subsets of BER (the Canonical Encoding Rules and the Distinguished Encoding Rules), are defined by the ITU-T's X.690 standards document, which is part of the ASN.1 document series.

== BER encoding ==
Basic Encoding Rules specifies in general terms, a partially self-describing and self-delimiting protocol for encoding ASN.1 data structures. Each data element is to be encoded as a type identifier, a length description, the actual data elements, and, where necessary, an end-of-content marker. These types of encodings are commonly called type–length–value (TLV) encodings. However, in BER's terminology, it is identifier-length-contents.

This type of format would allow a receiver to decode the ASN.1 information from an incomplete stream, without requiring any pre-knowledge of the size, content, or semantic meaning of the data, though some specifics of the protocol would need to be provided or reverse-engineered from representative samples of traffic or software.

Data encoding consists of three or four components, in the following order:

Identifier octets Type	Length octets Length	Contents octets Value	End-of-Contents octets (only if indefinite form)

Note that if a Length is zero, then there are no Contents octets, e.g. the NULL type. The End-of-Contents octets are only used for the indefinite form of Length.

=== Identifier octets ===
The BER identifier octets encode the ASN.1 tags. The list of Universal Class tags can be found at Rec. ITU-T X.680, clause 8, table 1. The following tags are native to ASN.1:

Types, universal class
Name	Permitted construction	Tag number	
Name	Permitted construction	Decimal	Hexadecimal
End-of-Content (EOC)	Primitive	0	0
BOOLEAN	Primitive	1	1
INTEGER	Primitive	2	2
BIT STRING	Both	3	3
OCTET STRING	Both	4	4
NULL	Primitive	5	5
OBJECT IDENTIFIER	Primitive	6	6
Object Descriptor	Both	7	7
EXTERNAL	Constructed	8	8
REAL (float)	Primitive	9	9
ENUMERATED	Primitive	10	A
EMBEDDED PDV	Constructed	11	B
UTF8String	Both	12	C
RELATIVE-OID	Primitive	13	D
TIME	Primitive	14	E
Reserved		15	F
SEQUENCE and SEQUENCE OF	Constructed	16	10
SET and SET OF	Constructed	17	11
NumericString	Both	18	12
PrintableString	Both	19	13
T61String	Both	20	14
VideotexString	Both	21	15
IA5String	Both	22	16
UTCTime	Both	23	17
GeneralizedTime	Both	24	18
GraphicString	Both	25	19
VisibleString	Both	26	1A
GeneralString	Both	27	1B
UniversalString	Both	28	1C
CHARACTER STRING	Constructed	29	1D
BMPString	Both	30	1E
DATE	Primitive	31	1F
TIME-OF-DAY	Primitive	32	20
DATE-TIME	Primitive	33	21
DURATION	Primitive	34	22
OID-IRI	Primitive	35	23
RELATIVE-OID-IRI	Primitive	36	24

==== Encoding ====
The identifier octets encode the ASN.1 tag's class number and type number. It also encodes whether the contents octets represent a constructed or primitive value. The Identifier spans one or more octets.

Octet 1								Octet 2 ... n Only if tag type > 30_{10}							
8	7	6	5	4	3	2	1	8	7	6	5	4	3	2	1
Tag class		P/C	Tag type (if 0–30_{10})					Long Form							
Tag class		P/C	31_{10} = Long Form					1=More	7 bits of Tag type						

In the initial octet, bit 6 encodes whether the type is primitive or constructed, bit 7–8 encode the tag's class, and bits 1–5 encode the tag's type. The following values are possible:

Class	Value	Description
Universal	0	The type is native to ASN.1
Application	1	The type is only valid for one specific application
Context-specific	2	Meaning of this type depends on the context (such as within a sequence, set or choice)
Private	3	Defined in private specifications

P/C	Value	Description
Primitive (P)	0	The contents octets directly encode the value.
Constructed (C)	1	The contents octets contain 0, 1, or more encodings.

If the tag's type fits in the 5-bits (0-30_{10}), then the Identifier spans just one byte: Short Form. If the tag's type is too large for the 5-bit tag field (> 30_{10}), it has to be encoded in further octets: Long Form.

The initial octet encodes the class and primitive/constructed as before, and bits 1–5 are 1. The tag number is encoded in the following octets, where bit 8 of each is 1 if there are more octets, and bits 1–7 encode the tag number. The tag number bits combined, big-endian, encode the tag number. The least number of following octets should be encoded; that is, bits 1–7 should not all be 0 in the first following octet.

=== Length octets ===
There are two forms of the length octets: The definite form and the indefinite form.

First length octet
Form	Bits							
Form	8	7	6	5	4	3	2	1
Definite, short	0	Length (0–127)						
Indefinite	1	0						
Definite, long	1	Number of following octets (1–126)						
Reserved	1	127						

==== Definite form ====
This encodes the number of content octets and is always used if the type is primitive or constructed and data are immediately available. There is a short form and a long form, which can encode different ranges of lengths. Numeric data is encoded as unsigned integers with the least significant bit always first (to the right).

The short form consists of a single octet in which bit 8 is 0, and bits 1–7 encode the length (which may be 0) as a number of octets.

The long form consists of 1 initial octet followed by 1 or more subsequent octets, containing the length. In the initial octet, bit 8 is 1, and bits 1–7 (excluding the values 0 and 127) encode the number of octets that follow. The following octets encode, as big-endian, the length (which may be 0) as a number of octets.

Long form example, length 435
Octet 1								Octet 2								Octet 3							
1	0	0	0	0	0	1	0	0	0	0	0	0	0	0	1	1	0	1	1	0	0	1	1
Long form	2 length octets							110110011_{2} = 435_{10} content octets															

==== Indefinite form ====
This does not encode the length at all, but that the content octets finish at marker octets. This applies to constructed types and is typically used if the content is not immediately available at encoding time.

It consists of a single octet, in which bit 8 is 1, and bits 1–7 are 0. Then, two end-of-contents octets must terminate the content octets.

=== Contents octets ===
The contents octets encode the element data value.

Note that there may be no contents octets (hence, the element has a length of 0) if only the existence of the ASN.1 object, or its emptiness, is to be noted. For example, this is the case for an ASN.1 NULL value.

== CER encoding ==
CER (Canonical Encoding Rules) is a restricted variant of BER for producing unequivocal transfer syntax for data structures described by ASN.1. Whereas BER gives choices as to how data values may be encoded, CER (together with DER) selects just one encoding from those allowed by the basic encoding rules, eliminating the rest of the options. CER is useful when the encodings must be preserved; e.g., in security exchanges.

== DER encoding ==
DER (Distinguished Encoding Rules) is a restricted variant of BER for producing unequivocal transfer syntax for data structures described by ASN.1. Like CER, DER encodings are valid BER encodings. DER is the same thing as BER with all but one sender's options removed.

DER is a subset of BER providing for exactly one way to encode an ASN.1 value. DER is intended for situations when a unique encoding is needed, such as in cryptography, and ensures that a data structure that needs to be digitally signed produces a unique serialized representation. DER can be considered a canonical form of BER. For example, in BER a Boolean value of true can be encoded as any of 255 non-zero byte values, while in DER there is one way to encode a Boolean value of true.

The most significant DER encoding constraints are:

1. Length encoding must use the definite form
  - Additionally, the shortest possible length encoding must be used
2. Bitstring, octetstring, and restricted character strings must use the primitive encoding
3. Elements of a Set are encoded in sorted order, based on their tag value

DER is widely used for digital certificates such as X.509.

== BER, CER and DER compared ==
The key difference between the BER format and the CER or DER formats is the flexibility provided by the Basic Encoding Rules. BER, as explained above, is the basic set of encoding rules given by ITU-T X.690 for the transfer of ASN.1 data structures. It gives senders clear rules for encoding data structures they want to send, but also leaves senders some encoding choices. As stated in the X.690 standard, "Alternative encodings are permitted by the basic encoding rules as a sender's option. Receivers who claim conformance to the basic encoding rules shall support all alternatives".

A receiver must be prepared to accept all legal encodings in order to legitimately claim BER-compliance. By contrast, both CER and DER restrict the available length specifications to a single option. As such, CER and DER are restricted forms of BER and serve to disambiguate the BER standard.

CER and DER differ in the set of restrictions that they place on the sender. The basic difference between CER and DER is that DER uses definitive length form and CER uses indefinite length form in some precisely defined cases. That is, DER always has leading length information, while CER uses end-of-contents octets instead of providing the length of the encoded data. Because of this, CER requires less metadata for large encoded values, while DER does it for small ones.

In order to facilitate a choice between encoding rules, the X.690 standards document provides the following guidance:

The distinguished encoding rules is more suitable than the canonical encoding rules if the encoded value is small enough to fit into the available memory and there is a need to rapidly skip over some nested values. The canonical encoding rules is more suitable than the distinguished encoding rules if there is a need to encode values that are so large that they cannot readily fit into the available memory or it is necessary to encode and transmit a part of a value before the entire value is available. The basic encoding rules is more suitable than the canonical or distinguished encoding rules if the encoding contains a set value or set-of value and there is no need for the restrictions that the canonical and distinguished encoding rules impose.

=== Criticisms of BER encoding ===
There is a common perception of BER as being "inefficient" compared to alternative encoding rules. It has been argued by some that this perception is primarily due to poor implementations, not necessarily any inherent flaw in the encoding rules. These implementations rely on the flexibility that BER provides to use encoding logic that is easier to implement, but results in a larger encoded data stream than necessary. Whether this inefficiency is reality or perception, it has led to a number of alternative encoding schemes, such as the Packed Encoding Rules, which attempt to improve on BER performance and size.

Other alternative formatting rules, which still provide the flexibility of BER but use alternative encoding schemes, are also being developed. The most popular of these are XML-based alternatives, such as the XML Encoding Rules and ASN.1 SOAP. In addition, there is a standard mapping to convert an XML Schema to an ASN.1 schema, which can then be encoded using BER.

== Usage ==
Despite its perceived problems, BER is a popular format for transmitting data, particularly in systems with different native data encodings.

- The SNMP and LDAP protocols specify ASN.1 with BER as their required encoding scheme.
- The EMV standard for credit and debit cards uses BER to encode data onto the card
- The digital signature standard PKCS #7 also specifies ASN.1 with BER to encode encrypted messages and their digital signature or digital envelope.
- Many telecommunication systems, such as ISDN, toll-free call routing, and most cellular phone services use ASN.1 with BER to some degree for transmitting control messages over the network.
- GSM TAP (Transferred Account Procedures), NRTRDE (Near Real Time Roaming Data Exchange) files are encoded using BER.

By comparison, the more definite DER encoding is widely used to transfer digital certificates such as X.509.

== See also ==
- Kerberos
- Packed Encoding Rules (PER, X.691)
- Presentation layer
- Structured Data eXchange Format (SDXF)
- Serialization
