= T.50 (standard) =

ITU-T recommendation T.50 specifies the International Reference Alphabet (IRA), formerly International Alphabet No. 5 (IA5), a character encoding. ASCII is the U.S. variant of that character set.

The original version from November 1988 corresponds to ISO 646. The current version is from September 1992.

== History ==
At the beginning was the International Telegraph Alphabet No. 2 (ITA2), a five-bit code. IA5 is an improvement, based on seven-bit bytes.

- Recommendation V.3 IA5 (1968): Initial version, superseded
- Recommendation V.3 IA5 (1972): Superseded
- Recommendation V.3 IA5 (1976-10): Superseded
- Recommendation V.3 IA5 (1980-11): Superseded
- Recommendation T.50 IA5 (1984-10): Superseded
- Recommendation T.50 IA5 (1988-11-25): Superseded
- Recommendation T.50 IRA (1992-09-18): In force

== Use ==
The IA5STRING string type in ASN.1 is restricted to characters in IA5. This standard is referenced by other standards such as RFC 3939 ("Calling Line Identification for Voice Mail Messages"). It is also used by some analog modems such as Cisco ones.

== Character set ==
The following table shows the IA5 character set. Each character is shown with the code point of its Unicode equivalent.

IA5 character set
	0	1	2	3	4	5	6	7	8	9	A	B	C	D	E	F
0x	NUL	SOH	STX	ETX	EOT	ENQ	ACK	BEL	BS	HT	LF	VT	FF	CR	SO	SI
1x	DLE	DC1	DC2	DC3	DC4	NAK	SYN	ETB	CAN	EM	SUB	ESC	FS	GS	RS	US
2x	SP	!	"	#	$	%	&	'	(	)	*	+	,	-	.	/
3x	0	1	2	3	4	5	6	7	8	9	:	;	<	=	>	?
4x	@	A	B	C	D	E	F	G	H	I	J	K	L	M	N	O
5x	P	Q	R	S	T	U	V	W	X	Y	Z	[	\	]		_
6x	`	a	b	c	d	e	f	g	h	i	j	k	l	m	n	o
7x	p	q	r	s	t	u	v	w	x	y	z	{	|	}	~	DEL

Undefined, showing instead the ASCII character at that location)
A character that, in some regions, can be combined with a previous character as a diacritic using the backspace character, which may affect glyph choice.

== Standardisation ==
- Identical standard: ISO/IEC 646:1991 (Twinned)

== See also ==
- ITU T.51
- PrintableString, a subset of IA5String
