= Message sequence chart =

Interaction diagram from the SDL family

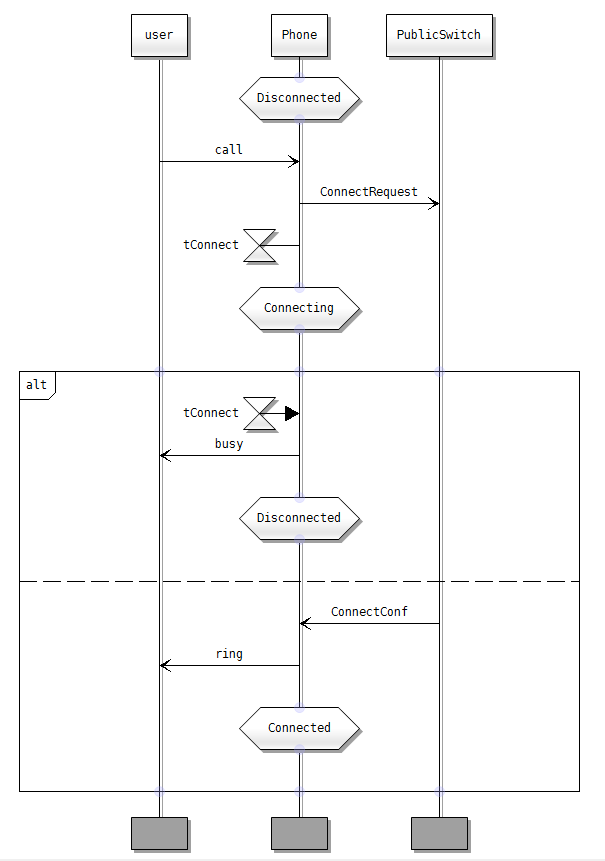
The diagram shows three entities. At start the phone is disconnected. A user tries to establish a connection. A connection request is sent to the switch and a timer is started. An alternative deals with two possibles responses: 1 - The timer goes off because the switch did not reply and the phone goes back to the disconnected state.2 - The switch grants the connection and the call is established.

A message sequence chart (or MSC) is an interaction diagram from the SDL family standardized by the International Telecommunication Union.

The purpose of recommending MSC (Message Sequence Chart) is to provide a trace language for the specification and description of the communication behaviour of system components and their environment by means of message interchange. Since in MSCs the communication behaviour is presented in a very intuitive and transparent manner, particularly in the graphical representation, the MSC language is easy to learn, use and interpret. In connection with other languages it can be used to support methodologies for system specification, design, simulation, testing, and documentation.

== History ==
The first version of the MSC standard was released on March 12, 1993.

The 1996 version added references, ordering and inlining expressions concepts, and introduced HMSC (High-level Message Sequence Charts), which are the way of expressing a sequence of MSCs.

The MSC 2000 version added object orientation, refined the use of data and time in diagrams, and added the concept of remote method calls.

Latest version has been published in February 2011.

== Symbols in MSC ==
The existing symbols are:

- MSC head, lifeline, and end: a vertical line with a box at the top, and a box or a cross at the bottom.
- Instance creation: horizontal dashed arrow to the newly created instance.
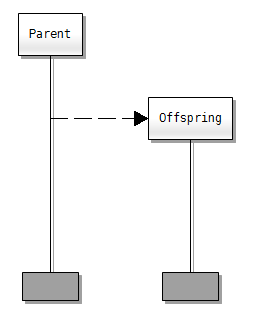
  Dynamic process creation in an MSC
- Message exchange: horizontal arrow.
- Control flow: horizontal arrow with the 'call' prefix, dashed arrow for reply symbol, method and suspension symbols in between.
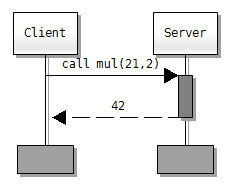
  Call operation in an MSC
- Timers: start, cancel, time out.
- Time interval: relative and absolute with a dashed vertical arrow.
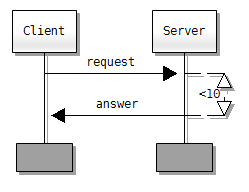
  Time constraint in an MSC
- Conditions: usually used to represent a state of the underlying state machine.
- Action: a box.
- In-line expressions: alternative composition, sequential composition, exception, optional region, parallel composition, iteration (loop).
- Reference: reference to another MSC.
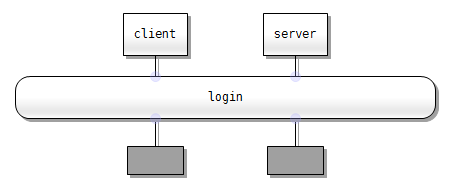
  MSC Reference in an MSC
- Data concept: The user can use any data concept, if binding is undefined the default data concept is the one from SDL as defined in Z.121 recommendation.
- Coregion: a double dashed instance line to describe unordered events.

== Symbol extensions ==
- SDL-RT has introduced:
  - a semaphore instance representation.
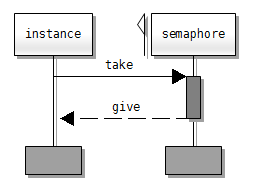
    SDL-RT Semaphore extension to MSC
  - a save symbol to save messages.

== Comparison to UML ==
UML 2.0 Sequence Diagram is strongly inspired by the ITU-T MSC. Still, for historical reasons, the default basic principles are quite different:

- Lifelines

- In an MSC, the vertical lines are autonomous execution entities. They usually represent state machines executing in parallel. The state machines need not be on the same computer.
- In a Sequence Diagram, a vertical line is usually an object. The object can be active (in its own thread of execution) or passive (in the execution context of an active object).

- Arrows

- In an MSC an arrow is usually an asynchronous message sent from one entity to another one. Once the message is sent the sending entity resumes its execution.
- In a Sequence Diagram an arrow is usually understood as an operation call on a class. It is therefore synchronous and the calling entity hangs until the operation returns.

It has been said that MSC has been considered as a candidate for the interaction diagrams in UML.

However, proponents of MSC such as Ericsson think that MSC is better than UML 2.0 for modelling large or complex systems.

== Live Sequence Charts ==
David Harel suggested that MSC had shortcomings such as:

- MSC propose a weak partial ordering semantics that makes it impossible to capture some behavioral requirements,
- The relationship between the MSC requirements and the executable specification is not clear,

and proposed Live Sequence Charts (LSC) as an extension on the MSC standard .

== See also ==
- PSC Property Sequence Chart, a way to describe properties in an MSC or a Sequence Diagram.
- SDL Specification and Description Language, an MSC related ITU-T language.
- Interaction diagrams in UML.
