= Jean-Georges Perrin =

- Born: Jean-Georges Perrin; 5 October 1971 (age 54); Strasbourg, France
- Other name: jgp
- Education: ESIG (Strasbourg), IUT Robert Schuman, part of University of Strasbourg (Strasbourg)
- Occupations: Software engineer, Serial entrepreneur, Businessman
- Years active: 1995–present
- Awards: IBM Champion (2009-2024); Lifetime IBM Champion (2021); PayPal Champion (2024)
- Website: http://www.jgp.ai

Jean-Georges Perrin (born 1971) is an IT serial-entrepreneur from Alsace, France. First French citizen to become an IBM Champion in 2009, along with Jean-Marc Blaise.,, he is now one of the 30 Lifetime IBM Champions. Perrin is a recognized author (self-published, Manning, and O'Reilly).

== Career ==
Perrin is an IT software engineer, lecturer, and serial entrepreneur. In 1995, he took part in the creation of Pandemonium, one of France's first commercial ISP to be located outside of the Paris area, later acquired by ISION. In 2002, he co-founded Awoma, an ISV specialized in making Java development easier. In 2006, he founded GreenIvory, a pioneer in Content Marketing tools. GreenIvory France and GreenIvory Luxembourg closed in January 2014, GreenIvory America closed a little later. In 2015, Perrin joined 2CRSI Corporation as Chief Operations Officer (COO)., Since 2016, Perrin is consulting in software engineering, big data, and Apache Spark. In 2021, Perrin joined PayPal and since then focuses on data mesh.

== IBM and IIUG ==
Perrin was elected at the Board of Directors of IIUG in 2002. Until 2017, we was the longest standing elected board member of IIUG after Stuart Litel and the first non-US citizen elected to this board.

In January 2024, his IBM Champion title was renewed for the 16th consecutive time.

== Bitol and The Linux Foundation ==
In November 2023, Perrin contributes Bitol to The Linux Foundation. The mission is to foster a set of standards to define data contracts, data products, and more in order to tackle multiple data engineering challenges, such as data normalization, ensuring the relevance of documentation, establishing service-level expectations, simplifying data and tool integration, and promoting a data product-oriented approach. The first project issued from Bitol is an open standard for data contracts called Open Data Contract Standard (ODCS).

== Publications and conferences ==
Perrin has contributed to the defunct DB2 Magazine, to The Futurist magazine co-author with Elizabeth D. Leone. Perrin co-authored with Frederic Collet-Hahn a book on the C programming language in August 1992, while a student at the now-Université de Strasbourg. More recently, he authored two ebooks on Informix. In 2020, he published Spark in Action, second edition covering data engineering with Spark and Java, Python, and Scala through Manning, the foreword was written by IBM’s Rob D. Thomas. In 2023, he published a book for kids titled Data Mesh for all ages focusing on data mesh for a vast audience. The book has been translated in several languages. In January 2024, Perrin contributes to Nick Tunes's Architecture Modernization at Manning Publications Co. In September 2024, he publishes with Eric Broda Implementing Data Mesh at O'Reilly. During 2024, Perrin also self-published Data Contract for all ages and Data Products for all ages.

Perrin participates in numerous conferences and lectures at various schools and universities, including the Université de Strasbourg, Spark Summit., and more. Perrin is a regular speaker at All Things Open in Raleigh, NC.

== Other recognitions ==
In 2012, Perrin was selected as one of 60 Alsatian entrepreneurs whose profiles were published in the Dernières Nouvelles d'Alsace on the occasion of the 60th anniversary of ADIRA, an agency that supports business in Alsace.

In 2024, after leaving PayPal in 2023, Perrin was named a PayPal Champion.
