= Stuart Litel =

Stuart Litel (born 1961 – 19 April 2025) is the founder of the New England Informix User Group (NEIUG) and has been an active member of the International Informix Users Group (IIUG), which he joined in 1997. He is a former president of IIUG from 2004 through 2018.

== Awards and Recognitions ==
Litel is an IBM Champion since 2008, the beginning of the program. He is also an IBM Gold Consultant since 2004. In 2006, he was the winner of the IBM Information Champion person of the year. He is also one of the founding selections by IBM as what is now the IBM Champions (https://community.ibm.com/community/user/champions/home) as well as one of the first IBM Lifetime Data Champions ever named.

== Litel and Informix ==
Although external to the company, Stuart has actively participated in the development of Informix tools and databases.

== Publications ==
Stuart is a regular contributor to DB2 Magazine, and IBM Database Magazine. as well as DBTA magazine (www.dbta.com)
