= Composite index =

Composite index may refer to:

- Composite (finance), in finance
- Composite index (database), an index involving multiple columns
- Composite index (metrics), a new metrics index used in research
