= Sargable =

Concept in databases

In relational databases, a condition (or predicate) in a query is said to be sargable if the DBMS engine can take advantage of an index to speed up the execution of the query. The term is derived from a contraction of Search ARGument ABLE. It was first used by IBM researchers as a contraction of Search ARGument, and has come to mean simply "can be looked up by an index."^{1}

For database query optimizers, sargable is an important property in OLTP workloads because it suggests a good query plan can be obtained by a simple heuristic^{2} matching query to indexes instead of a complex, time-consuming cost-based search, thus it is often desired to write sargable queries. A query failing to be sargable is called non-sargable and typically has a negative effect on query time, so one of the steps in query optimization is to convert them to be sargable. The effect is similar to searching for a specific term in a book that has no index, beginning at page one each time, instead of jumping to a list of specific pages identified in an index.

The typical situation that will make an SQL query non-sargable is to include in the WHERE clause a function operating on a column value. The WHERE clause is not the only clause where sargability can matter; it can also have an effect on ORDER BY, GROUP BY and HAVING clauses. The SELECT list, on the other hand, can contain non-sargable expressions without adversely affecting the performance.

Some database management systems, for instance PostgreSQL, support functional indices. Conceptually, an index is a mapping between a value and one or more locations. With a functional index, the value stored in the index is the output of the function specified when the index is created. This capability expands what is sargable beyond base column expressions.

- Sargable operators: =, >, <, >=, <=, BETWEEN, LIKE, IS [NOT] NULL, IN
- Sargable operators that rarely improve performance: <>, NOT, NOT IN, NOT LIKE

== Simple example ==
WHERE clauses that are sargable typically have column values on the left of the operator, and scalar values or expressions on the right side of the operator.

Not sargable:

SELECT *
FROM   myTable
WHERE  SQRT(myIntColumn) > 11.7

This is not sargable because myIntColumn is embedded in a function. If any indexes were available on myIntColumn, they could not be used. In addition, SQRT() would be called on every row in myTable.

Sargable version:

SELECT *
FROM   myTable
WHERE  myIntColumn > 11.7 * 11.7

This is sargable because myIntColumn is NOT contained in a function, making any available indexes on myIntColumn potentially usable. Furthermore, the expression is evaluated only once, rather than for each row in the table.

== Text example ==
WHERE ... LIKE clauses that are sargable have column values on the left of the operator, and LIKE text strings that do not begin with the % on the right.

Not sargable:

SELECT *
FROM   myTable
WHERE  myNameColumn LIKE '%Wales%' -- Begins with %, not sargable

This is not sargable. It must examine every row to find the column containing the substring 'Wales' in any position.

Sargable version:

SELECT *
FROM   myTable
WHERE  myNameColumn LIKE 'Jimmy%' -- Does not begin with %, sargable

This is sargable. It can use an index to find all the myNameColumn values that start with the substring 'Jimmy'.

== See also ==
- Block Range Index
- Query optimization

== Notes ==
^1 Gulutzan and Pelzer, (Chapter 2, Simple "Searches")
^2 gives an example of such simple heuristic.
