= Pseudocolumn =

A Pseudocolumn is a "column" that yields a value when selected, but which is not an actual column of the table. An example is RowID or SysDate. It is often used in combination with the DUAL table.
