= Sarg =

Sarg may refer to:

- Charles Sprague Sargent (1841–1927), American botanist (standard abbreviation for his name is "Sarg.")
- SARG — Syrian Arab Republic Government
- Searchable Arguments in the WHERE clause of a SQL database query.
- SARG04, a quantum key distribution protocol

== People with the surname ==
- Tony Sarg (1880–1942), German-American puppeteer and illustrator
