= Hint (SQL) =

In various SQL implementations, a hint is an addition to the SQL standard that instructs the database engine on how to execute the query. For example, a hint may tell the engine to use or not to use an index (even if the query optimizer would decide otherwise).

== Implementation ==
Different database engines use different approaches in implementing hints.

- MySQL uses its own extension to the SQL standard, where a table name may be followed by USE INDEX, FORCE INDEX or IGNORE INDEX keywords.
- Oracle implements hints by using specially-crafted comments in the query that begin with a + symbol, thus not affecting SQL compatibility.
- EDB Postgres Advanced Server (a proprietary version of PostgreSQL from EnterpriseDB) offers hints compatible with those of Oracle.
- Microsoft SQL Server offers hints via the OPTION keyword

== See also ==
- Query optimizer
- Query plan
