= Fixed point =

Fixed point may refer to:

- Fixed point (mathematics), a value that does not change under a given transformation
- Fixed-point arithmetic, a manner of doing arithmetic on computers
- Fixed point, a benchmark (surveying) used by geodesists
- Fixed point join, also called a recursive join
- Fixed point, in quantum field theory, a coupling where the beta function vanishes – see renormalization group § Conformal symmetry
- Temperature reference point, usually defined by a phase change or triple point.
