= International Informix Users Group =

International Informix Users Group (IIUG)
- Established: 1995
- Type: Professional association
- Headquarters: Phoenix, Arizona, USA
- Region served: Informix's users
- Key people: Cindy Lichtenauer, President iiug.org/en/about-iiug/board/
- Website: iiug.org

The International Informix Users Group (IIUG) is a non-profit organization whose goals are to provide support and education for users of Informix products and technology.

Membership to IIUG has always been free. IIUG counted over 28,000 members in 2007.

== History ==
It has been created in 1995 by five founders:

- Carlton Doe,
- Walt Hultgren,
- Lester Knutsen,
- Malcolm Weallans and
- Cathy Kipp.

As of 2013, the IIUG is a non-profit organization.

== Services ==
IIUG provides many services to its members including a monthly newsletter, a jobs board, and SIG forums.

=== News ===
One of the main service of IIUG is to publish news through a monthly newsletter (The Insider ). Previous editors of the Insider are Fred (Federico) Hubbard, Jean Georges Perrin, Gary Ben-Israel and David Fraser.

=== Forum ===
For many years the IIUG provided SIG forums with topics on Informix-4GL, Informix Dynamic Server, etc. Beginning in 2019 community support has been moved to the IBM Communities site .

All IIUG Forum history continues to be accessible and searchable from the IIUG web site at:

=== TV ===
More recently, IIUG has started its own TV channel: http://www.iiug.tv.

=== Conference ===
IIUG has organized and conducted its own user conference since 2008 usually held in late April. The 2014 conference was held in Miami, Florida, from April 27 to May 1.

== Management ==
It is managed by a board, composed of 10 elected volunteers and 1 liaison to IBM, who now owns the Informix product line.

=== Current Board of Directors ===
For 2019-2020, the board is composed of:

- Cindy Lichtenauer (President), United States.
- Stuart Litel (IBM Representative), United States.
- Gary Ben-Israel, National Institute for Testing and Evaluation, Israel.
- Rhonda Hackenburg, PACLE, United States.
- Art Kagel, ASK Database Management, United States.
- Vicente Salvador, Deister, Spain.
- Ognjen Orel, University of Zagreb, Croatia.
- David Link, West Corp., United States.
- Eric Vercelletto, Begooden-IT Consulting, France.

=== Past Board of Directors Members ===
Many people have devoted their time and efforts to support the Informix user community through service on the Board, including:

- Tom Beebe, Advanced DataTools Corp., United States.
- Gary Ben-Israel, Israel.
- Khaled Bentebal, ConsultIX, France.
- Miguel Carbone, MC IT Solutions, Brazil.
- Chetan Chaturvedi, IBM Representative.
- Carlton Doe, United States.
- Sergio Ferreira, MoreData, Portugal.
- Ron Flannery, United States.
- Andrew Ford, United States.
- Tammy Frankforter, Anchorage School District, United States.
- David Fraser, Logis, New Zealand.
- Rhonda Hackenburg, United States.
- Fred Hubbard, United States.
- Walt Hultgren (Past President), United States.
- June Hunt, United States.
- Norma Jean Sebastian, United States.
- Art Kagel, ASK Database Management, United States.
- Cathy Kipp, United States.
- Lester Knutsen, Advanced DataTools Corp., United States.
- Cindy Lichtenauer (Current President), United States.
- David Link, United States.
- Stuart Litel (Past President, Current IBM Representative), United States.
- Al Martin, IBM, United States.
- Janet Oswald, IBM, United States.
- Jean Georges Perrin, France.
- Mark Scranton, United States.
- Michael Segel, United States.
- Bruce Simms, United States.
- Kernoal Stephens, United States.
- Kate Tomchick, Home Depot, United States.
- Neil Truby, United Kingdom.
- Eric Vercelletto, Begooden-IT Consulting, France.
- Malcolm Weallans, United States.
- Bruce Weed, IBM, United States.
