= Join selection factor =

Within computing, author O'Connell defines join selection factor as "[t]he percentage (or fraction) of records in one file that will be joined with records of another file". This can be calculated when two database tables are to be joined. It is primarily concerned with query optimization.
