= Charles Weiss =

American computer scientist and software designer

Charles "Chuck" Weiss is an American computer scientist and software designer.

== Life and career ==
Weiss was a childhood friend of Larry Ellison. He graduated from the College of Engineering at Cornell University in 1966.

Weiss worked at American Airlines, where he developed one of the first data-driven decision support systems with Richard Klaas from 1970 to 1974.

Weiss was one of the first employees of the technology company Oracle Corporation, now the third-largest software company in the world. He joined the company in 1982, when there were only twenty-five employees. The positions of Weiss at Oracle including being the executive director of product design and later the senior director of technology marketing. Weiss is the inventor of the DUAL table.

In 2001, Weiss and his wife Barbara created an endowment for the Charles F. and Barbara D. Weiss Directorship of the Information Science Program in the Faculty of Computing and Information Science at Cornell University. Weiss has also volunteered as a Silicon Valley advisor for the university.
