= IBM Data Magazine =

- Editor: Kim Moutsos (Editor-in-chief)
- Categories: Computing magazine
- Frequency: Business
- Total circulation: 100,000
- Founder: David Stodder
- Founded: 1996; 30 years ago
- Final issue: 2012; 14 years ago
- Company: TDA Group for IBM Corp
- Country: United States
- Language: English
- Website: ibmdatabasemag.com

IBM Data magazine is a U.S.-based custom, online magazine published by TDA Group for IBM Corp. With a worldwide readership of more than 100,000, the magazine provides how-to information about Db2, Informix, UniVerse, and UniData, along with coverage of related tools, software, and solutions (including those that fall under IBM's Information On Demand initiative).

The magazine was established in 1996 as DB2 Magazine. It was acquired in 2001 by the IBM Corporation. In 2008, the magazine's name changed to IBM Database Magazine before later changing to IBM Data Management magazine in 2009 when it switched publishers. With a worldwide readership of more than 100,000, the magazine provides how-to information about IBM information management software, including the IBM Db2, Informix, UniVerse, and UniData data servers, and related tools, software, and solutions (including those that fall under IBM's Information On Demand initiative). The publication was renamed to IBM Data magazine in 2012 to reflect the magazine's shift to cover more of IBM's data management product portfolio.

== History ==
DB2 Magazine's 1996 launch coincided with the beta program for IBM's DB2 Universal Database (UDB), which combined DB2 version 2 with DB2 Parallel Edition and is the precursor of the hybrid XML-relational DB2 9.

Originally published by Miller Freeman, Inc., the magazine was created by David Stodder, then editor of Miller Freeman's Database Programming and Design magazine. Stodder went on to launch Intelligent Enterprise magazine with the editors of DBMS magazine and served as editorial director of both Intelligent Enterprise and DB2 Magazine until he left CMP Technology in 2007. Current editor Kim Moutsos joined the magazine as associate editor in 1998 and assumed the editor-in-chief position in 2001.

Over the past decade, the focus of the magazine's technical articles, primarily written by DBAs, developers, consultants, and other industry experts, has expanded to include topics such as business intelligence and analytics, content management and information discovery, and information integration. In 2005, the magazine introduced coverage of the Informix technologies that IBM acquired in 2001.

In 2008, the magazine and Web site relaunched as IBM Database Magazine, to reflect its coverage of multiple IBM database products.

In 2009, the magazine and Web site relaunched as IBM Data Management magazine, to reflect its coverage of the entire IBM Data Management portfolio.

In 2012, the publication was renamed to IBM Data magazine to reflect the magazine's shift to cover more of IBM's data management product portfolio.

== DB2 Magazine Community Wiki ==
In May, 2007 DB2 Magazine launched a community wiki as part of a major site redesign. The community wiki is intended to provide a place for readers to share tips and tricks for working with IBM information management software. The wiki's mission is "to gather DB2, Informix, U2, Cloudscape and other IBM information management know-how and make it available to the DB2 Magazine community."

== See also ==
- IBM BLU Acceleration
