= Correlated subquery =

Computer query in SQL

In a SQL database query, a correlated subquery (also known as a synchronized subquery) is a subquery (a query nested inside another query) that uses values from the outer query. This can have major impact on performance because the correlated subquery might get recomputed every time for each row of the outer query is processed. A correlated subquery can contain another correlated subquery.

== Examples ==
=== Correlated subqueries in the WHERE clause ===
Here is an example for a typical correlated subquery. In this example, the objective is to find all employees whose salary is above average for their department.

 SELECT employee_number, name
   FROM employees emp
  WHERE salary > (
        SELECT AVG(salary)
          FROM employees
         WHERE department = emp.department);

In the above query the outer query is

 SELECT employee_number, name
   FROM employees emp
  WHERE salary > ...

and the inner query (the correlated subquery) is

 SELECT AVG(salary)
   FROM employees
  WHERE department = emp.department

In the above nested query the inner query has to be re-executed for each employee. (A sufficiently smart implementation may cache the inner query's result on a department-by-department basis, but even in the best case the inner query must be executed once per department.)

=== Correlated subqueries in the SELECT clause ===
Correlated subqueries may appear elsewhere besides the WHERE clause; for example, this query uses a correlated subquery in the SELECT clause to print the entire list of employees alongside the average salary for each employee's department. Again, because the subquery is correlated with a column of the outer query, it must be re-executed for each row of the result.

 SELECT employee_number,
        name,
        (SELECT AVG(salary) 
           FROM employees
          WHERE department = emp.department) AS department_average
   FROM employees emp

=== Correlated subqueries in the FROM clause ===
It is generally meaningless to have a correlated subquery in the FROM clause because the table in the FROM clause is needed to evaluate the outer query, but the correlated subquery in the FROM clause can't be evaluated before the outer query is evaluated, causing a chicken-and-egg problem. Specifically, MariaDB lists this as a limitation in its documentation.

However, in some database systems, it is allowed to use correlated subqueries while joining in the FROM clause, referencing the tables listed before the join using a specified keyword, producing a number of rows in the correlated subquery and joining it to the table on the left. For example, in PostgreSQL, adding the keyword LATERAL before the right-hand subquery, or in Microsoft SQL Server, using the keyword CROSS APPLY or OUTER APPLY instead of JOIN achieves the effect.

== Computation of correlated subqueries ==
A commonly used computational method for a correlated subquery is to rewrite it into an equivalent flat query (a process known as flattening or unnesting). The algorithm development in this direction has an advantage of low complexity. Because this is a customized approach, existing database systems cannot flatten arbitrary correlated subqueries by following certain general rules. In addition, this approach requires high engineering efforts to implement flattening algorithms into a database engine. A general computational approach is to directly execute the nested loop by iterating all tuples of the correlated columns from the outer query block and executing the subquery as many times as the number of outer-loop tuples. This simple approach has an advantage of general-purpose because it is not affected by the type of correlated operators or subquery structures. However, it has a high computational complexity. A GPU acceleration approach is used to significantly improve the performance of the nested method of high algorithmic complexity by exploiting massive parallelism and device memory locality on GPU, which accomplishes the goal for both general-purpose software design and implementation and high performance in subquery processing.
