= From (SQL) =

SQL clause for selecting data source

The SQL From clause is the source of a rowset to be operated upon in a Data Manipulation Language (DML) statement. From clauses are very common, and will provide the rowset to be exposed through a Select statement, the source of values in an Update statement, and the target rows to be deleted in a Delete statement.

FROM is an SQL reserved word in the SQL standard.

The FROM clause is used in conjunction with SQL statements, and takes the following general form:

 SQL-DML-Statement
 FROM table_name 
 WHERE predicate

The From clause can generally be anything that returns a rowset, a table, view, function, or system-provided information like the Information Schema, which is typically running proprietary commands and returning the information in a table form.

== Examples ==
The following query returns only those rows from table mytable where the value in column mycol is greater than 100.

SELECT *
FROM   mytable
WHERE  mycol > 100

== Requirement ==
The From clause is technically required in relational algebra and in most scenarios to be useful. However many relational DBMS implementations may not require it for selecting a single value, or single row - known as DUAL table in Oracle database.

SELECT 3.14 AS Pi

Other systems will require a From statement with a keyword, even to select system data.

select to_char(sysdate, 'Dy DD-Mon-YYYY HH24:MI:SS') as "Current Time"
from dual;
