= Composite index (database) =

A database composite index or multi-column index is an index that is based on multiple columns.
