= Group by (SQL) =

SQL clause

A GROUP BY clause in SQL specifies that a SQL SELECT statement partitions result rows into groups, based on their values in one or several columns. Typically, grouping is used to apply some sort of aggregate function for each group.

The result of a query using a GROUP BY clause contains one row for each group. This implies constraints on the columns that can appear in the associated SELECT clause. As a general rule, the SELECT clause may only contain columns with a unique value per group. This includes columns that appear in the GROUP BY clause as well as aggregates resulting in one value per group.

== Examples ==
Returns a list of Department IDs along with the sum of their sales for the date of January 1, 2000.

   SELECT DeptID, SUM(SaleAmount) FROM Sales
    WHERE SaleDate = '01-Jan-2000'
 GROUP BY DeptID

In the following example one can ask "How many units were sold in each region for every ship date?":

Sum of units	Ship date ▼					
Region ▼	2005-01-31	2005-02-28	2005-03-31	2005-04-30	2005-05-31	2005-06-30
East	66	80	102	116	127	125
North	96	117	138	151	154	156
South	123	141	157	178	191	202
West	78	97	117	136	150	157
(blank)						
Grand total	363	435	514	581	622	640

The following code returns the data of the above pivot table which answers the question "How many units were sold in each region for every ship date?":

   SELECT Region, Ship_Date, SUM(Units) AS Sum_of_Units
     FROM FlatData
 GROUP BY Region, Ship_Date

== WITH ROLLUP ==
Since SQL:1999, GROUP BY can be extended WITH ROLLUP to add a result line with a super-aggregator result. In the above example, it corresponds to the Grand total line.

== Common groupings ==
Common grouping (aggregation) functions include:

- Count(expression) - Quantity of matching records (per group)
- Sum(expression) - Summation of given value (per group)
- Min(expression) - Minimum of given value (per group)
- Max(expression) - Maximum of given value (per group)
- Avg(expression) - Average of given value (per group)

== See also ==
- Aggregate function
