= Data mesh =

Distributed architecture framework for data management

Data mesh is a sociotechnical approach to building a decentralized data architecture by leveraging a domain-oriented, self-serve design (in a software development perspective), and borrows Eric Evans’ theory of domain-driven design and Manuel Pais’ and Matthew Skelton’s theory of team topologies. Data mesh mainly concerns itself with the data itself, taking the data lake and the pipelines as a secondary concern. The main proposition is scaling analytical data by domain-oriented decentralization. With data mesh, the responsibility for analytical data is shifted from the central data team to the domain teams, supported by a data platform team that provides a domain-agnostic data platform. This enables a decrease in data disorder or the existence of isolated data silos, due to the presence of a centralized system that ensures the consistent sharing of fundamental principles across various nodes within the data mesh and allows for the sharing of data across different areas.

== History ==
The term data mesh was first defined by Zhamak Dehghani in 2019 while she was working as a principal consultant at the technology company Thoughtworks. Dehghani introduced the term in 2019 and then provided greater detail on its principles and logical architecture throughout 2020. The process was predicted to be a “big contender” for companies in 2022. Data meshes have been implemented by companies such as Zalando, Netflix, Intuit, VistaPrint, PayPal and others.

In 2022, Dehghani left Thoughtworks to found Nextdata Technologies to focus on decentralized data.

== Principles ==
Data mesh is based on four core principles:

- domain ownership;
- data as a product;
- self-serve data platform;
- federated computational governance.

In addition to these principles, Dehghani writes that the data products created by each domain team should be discoverable, addressable, trustworthy, possess self-describing semantics and syntax, be interoperable, secure, and governed by global standards and access controls. In other words, the data should be treated as a product that is ready to use and reliable.

== In practice ==
After its introduction in 2019 multiple companies started to implement a data mesh and share their experiences. Challenges (C) and best practices (BP) for practitioners, include:

C1. Federated data governance
Companies report difficulties to adopt a federated governance structure for activities and processes that were previously centrally owned and enforced. This is especially true for security, privacy, and regulatory topics.
C2. Responsibility shift
In data mesh individuals within domains are end-to-end responsible for data products. This new responsibility can be challenging, because it is rarely compensated and usually benefits other domains.
C3. Comprehension
Research has shown a severe lack of comprehension for the data mesh paradigm among employees of companies implementing a data mesh.

BP1. Cross-domain unit
Addressing C1, organizations should introduce a cross-domain steering unit responsible for strategic planning, use case prioritization, and the enforcement of specific governance rules—especially concerning security, regulatory, and privacy-related topics. Nevertheless, a cross-domain steering unit can only complement and support the federated governance structure and may grow obsolete with the increasing maturity of the data mesh.
BP2. Track and observe
Addressing C2., organizations should observe and score data product quality as tracking and ranking key data products can encourage high-quality offerings, motivate domain owners, and support budget negotiations.
BP3. Conscious adoption
Organizations should thoroughly assess and evaluate their existing data systems, consider organizational factors, and weigh the potential benefits before implementing a data mesh. When introducing data mesh, it is advised to carefully and consciously introduce data mesh terminology to ensure a clear understanding of the concept (C3).

== Community ==
Scott Hirleman has started a data mesh community that contains over 7,500 people in their Slack channel.

== See also ==
- Data product
- Data management
- Data platform
- Data vault modeling, method of data modeling with storage of data from various operational systems and tracing of data origin, facilitating auditing, loading speeds and resilience
- Data warehouse, a well established type of database system for organizing data in a thematic way
- ETL and ELT
