= Informix =

Database management software product family

IBM Informix
- Developer: IBM / HCLSoftware
- Stable release: 15.0.0.1 / March 15, 2025
- Type: Multi-model database
- License: Commercial proprietary software
- Website: www.ibm.com/products/informix

HCL Informix
- Developer: HCLSoftware
- Stable release: 15.0.0.1 / March 31, 2025
- Type: Multi-model database
- License: Commercial proprietary software
- Website: www.hcltechsw.com/informix

OneDB
- Developer: HCLSoftware
- Stable release: 2.0.1.3 / May 12, 2023
- Type: Multi-model database
- License: Commercial proprietary software
- Website: www.hcltechsw.com/onedb

Informix is a product family within IBM's Information Management division that is centered on several relational database management system (RDBMS) and multi-model database offerings. The Informix products were originally developed by Informix Corporation, whose Informix Software subsidiary was acquired by IBM in 2001.

In April 2017, IBM delegated active development and support to HCLSoftware for 15 years (with automatic yearly renewals of the agreement), with a number of IBM employees working on Informix also moving to HCL. As part of this arrangement IBM will continue to market and sell it as IBM Informix to its customers, with HCLTech able to market and sell it as HCL Informix.

The Informix database has been used in many high transaction rate OLTP applications in the retail, finance, energy and utilities, manufacturing and transportation sectors. More recently the server has been enhanced to improve its support for data warehouse workloads. Through extensions, Informix supports data types that are not a part of the SQL standard.

On December 29, 2021, Actian (formerly Ingres Corporation) became fully owned by HCL. Actian remained a separate entity, now acting as the Data, Analytics and Insights division of HCLSoftware. The company is currently responsible for the commercialization of the HCL Informix portfolio within the group.

== Key products ==
As of 2025, the current version of both IBM and HCL Informix is 15.0. The major enhancement in v15.0 over previous releases is the removal of most internal limits including limits on the number of rows per data page, the number of data pages in a table partition,availability of additional larger page sizes, and the total storage that can be managed by a single Informix instance.

=== IBM Informix Releases and Versions ===
IBM Informix is offered in a number of editions, including free developer editions, editions for small and mid-sized business, and editions supporting the complete feature set and designed to be used in support of the largest enterprise applications. There used to be an advanced data warehouse edition, including the Informix Warehouse Accelerator (IWA), but it was deprecated in favor of the Advanced Enterprise Edition (which give entitlement rights to IWA).

As of February 2026, there are 6 available editions of IBM Informix:

- IBM Informix Developer Edition: A no-cost database server for individual application development, testing and prototyping. Limitations: 1 CPU VP/Core, 1GB RAM, 8GB of storage. Supported Platforms: Linux, UNIX, Windows and ARM.
- Informix Innovator-C Edition: A free database solution for development, testing, and small production use. Designed for small businesses or applications with real production workloads. Limitations: Limitations: 2 CPU Cores, 8GB RAM, and 50GB storage. Supported Platforms: Linux, UNIX, and Windows.
- IBM Informix Express Edition: Ideal for third-party developers who want to embed a database within their applications, available across all supported platforms. Limitations: 4 CPU Cores, 8GB RAM, and no support for advanced Storage Optimization, though it offers unlimited storage capacity.
- IBM Informix Workgroup Edition: Designed for midsize businesses and applications with real production workloads, available across all supported platforms. Limitations: maximum of 24 CPU cores, 32GB RAM, and no support for advanced Storage Optimization, though it offers unlimited storage capacity.
- IBM Informix Enterprise Edition: Includes all Informix features on all supported platforms except for IWA, available across all supported platforms.
- IBM Informix Advanced Enterprise Edition: Provides the complete suite of Informix features, including IWA and support for advanced Storage Optimization, available across all supported platforms, with unlimited storage capacity.

For information about the kind of support available for a specific product version, go to the IBM Informix Product Lifecycle page at http://www.ibm.com/software/data/support/lifecycle/.

=== HCL Informix Releases and Versions ===
HCL Informix is offered under a single commercial version, which is compatible with the IBM Informix Advanced Enterprise Edition, also having rights to IWA. There is also a trial version available, with no known limits, except for an expiration date. HCL Informix 14.10 and later versions provides functional parity with IBM Informix for on-premises deployments.

On July 24, 2020, HCL announced OneDB Database Server V1.0.0.0 as a multi-model (relational, object-relational, and dimensional) DBMS based on Informix. On August 19, 2021 HCL released OneDB 2.0 as a cloud native, multi-cloud, Kubernetes-orchestrated offering.

HCL Informix Version	General availability	End of Enterprise Support	End of Extended Support	End of Obsolescence Support	Notes
HCL Informix 15.0	November 14, 2024	November 31, 2029	November 31, 2030	November 31, 2033	This release focuses on massive scalability and performance improvements by removing most internal limits. Key enhancements include support for 8-byte row identifiers, allowing single fragments to grow up to 140 trillion pages, and 8-exabyte chunks. It also features enhanced Informix HQ monitoring, JSON compatibility, and better resource utilization.
HCL Informix 14.10.10 (and later)	March 31, 2023	March 31, 2027**	March 31, 2028	March 31, 2031	The major enhancements made in v14.10 over previous releases were adding built-in index compression, integration of JSON collections with support for MongoDB JSON drivers into the server, and an enhancement permitting database objects to be partitioned across multiple servers in a cluster or grid (aka sharding). Queries can optionally return data from the locally connected server instance or from an entire grid with the same SQL. All on-premises releases prior to HCL Informix 14.10.10 reached end of support on July 1, 2025. New dates have been published for 14.10.10 which does not contain Flexnet and has full lifecycle dates from the base 14.10 release.
HCL Informix 14.10.01 - 14.10.05	March 14, 2019	March 31, 2024	March 31, 2025	June 30, 2025*	Informix 14.10 introduced support for partial indexing where only a subset of the rows in a table are indexed and for multi-valued key indexes which support indexing the elements within multi-valued data types such as LIST, SET, MULTISET, and BSON array fields. Heterogeneous clusters are fully supported, and there are several deployment options that are available, including some that provide very high levels of data redundancy and fault tolerance. This feature is marketed by IBM as Informix Flexible Grid.
HCL Informix 12.10.x	July 11, 2018	July 31, 2023	July 31, 2024	June 30, 2025*	Informix 12.10 introduced enhanced JSON support, including direct loading into TimeSeries via TSL_PutJson(), alongside security updates like PAM authentication for DRDA and new configuration parameters for improved memory and lock management. Later fixpacks (xC4+) enabled automatic JSON compatibility, with improved BTS indexing and SQL packages for better application compatibility.

Legend:
Unsupported
Supported
Latest version
Preview version

OneDB Version	General availability	End of Enterprise Support	End of Extended Support	End of Obsolescence Support	Notes
OneDB 2.0.1.3	May 12, 2023	May 31, 2026*	May 31, 2028	May 31, 2030	All on-premises releases prior to OneDB 2.0.1.3 reached end of support and cease to function on July 1, 2025. New dates have been published for 2.0.1.3 which does not contain Flexnet and has full lifecycle dates.
OneDB 2.0 – 2.0.1.2	August 19, 2021	August 31, 2024	June 30, 2025*	N/A	HCL OneDB 2.0.1.1 addressed an Apache Log4j vulnerability (December 2021). HCL OneDB 2.0.1.2 added enhanced integration for HCL Commerce and HCL Unica, as well as wew Capabilities in Helm Chart better deployment experience in cloud native environments.
OneDB 1.0.x	September 15, 2020	September 30, 2023	June 30, 2025*	N/A	HCL OneDB is a derivative of the Informix database server, and so it shares a high degree of functionality with the Informix products. It is compatible with all current Informix versions at the SQL and application levels.

Legend:
Unsupported
Supported
Latest version
Preview version

[*] HCL Software deprecated usage of the Revenera Flexnet license management tool.

NOTE: The above dates apply to both the on-premises and marketplace versions.

For more information about the kind of support available for a specific product version, go to the HCL Informix Lifecycle Dates page at https://communities.actian.com/s/supportservices/lifecycle-dates/hcl-informix-lifecycle-dates?language=en_US.

== Positioning ==
Informix is generally considered to be optimized for environments with very low or no database administration, including use as an embedded database. It has a long track record of supporting very high transaction rates and providing uptime characteristics needed for mission critical applications such as manufacturing lines and reservation systems. Informix has been widely deployed in the retail sector, where the low administration overhead makes it useful for in-store deployments.

With the ability to deeply embed Informix in gateways and routers, timeseries support, small footprint, and low administration requirements, Informix is also targeted at Internet-of-Things solutions, where many of the data-handling requirements can be handled with gateways that embed Informix and connect sensors and devices to the internet.

== Other products ==
In addition to the products based on the version 15.0 engine the Informix family also includes a number of legacy database products which are still supported in market. These include Informix OnLine, Informix Standard Edition (SE), and Informix C-ISAM. These products are simpler and smaller footprint database engines that are also frequently embedded in third party applications. Collectively these products are often referred to as the "Informix Classics".

The Informix family also includes:

- Informix Client-SDK: a client-side development environment which supports a number of different environments including .net for Windows developers and a variety of protocols for Unix and Linux environments.
- Informix-4GL: a fourth generation language for application programming development.
- Informix Warehouse Accelerator (IWA): an in-memory database based on IBM BLU acceleration technology, which uses a combination of newer technologies including in-memory data, tokenization, deep compression, and columnar database technology to provide extreme high performance on business intelligence and data warehouse style queries. IWA can be installed on the same computer as the Informix database server or another one. It receives copies of data from the database server and organizes it into data marts.
- Informix Enterprise Gateway: it connects the Informix environment with that of any shared-library ODBC Level 2-compliant driver manager and driver on UNIX or Linux. Enterprise Gateway allows Informix database application developers and users to access information on DB2, Oracle, Sybase and other non-Informix databases as easily and transparently as if they were accessing an Informix database server.

Obsolete and non-IBM Informix heritage products can run via emulation on modern hardware.

== Training and certification ==
IBM Training includes a complete set of core Data Servers Training courses that apply to Informix. These courses delve into many essential Informix concepts, from fundamentals to advanced SQL topics.

As part of IBM's Academic Initiative, IBM is offering Informix software, documentation and training to higher education institutions worldwide through its new Informix on Campus program. IBM is offering an inclusive package of Informix materials to college faculty called "Informix In a Box", which offers hands-on labs and PowerPoints to use in lessons, recorded training for teachers, DVDs with class material and VMware virtual appliance images, as well as T-shirts for students.

HCL Informix training is provided by Actian, the Data & Analytics division of HCLSoftware, who is in charge of commercializing this product line within the group. Actian provides HCL Informix learning courses through Actian Academy and Actian Partner Academy, which also has a HCL Informix® 14.10 Certification.

== Users groups ==
Users groups remain active in Belgium, Croatia, France, Germany, the United States, and many other countries. The IIUG (International Informix Users Group) acts as a federation of those user groups and provides numerous services to its members.

== See also ==
- Comparison of relational database management systems
- List of relational database management systems
