= Data domain =

Values that a data element may contain

In database theory, a data domain is the collection of values that a data element may contain. The rule for determining the domain boundary may be as simple as a data type with an enumerated list of values.

For example, a database table that has information about people, with one record per person, might have a "marital status" column. This column might be declared as a string data type, and allowed to have one of two known code values: "M" for married, "S" for single, and NULL for records where marital status is unknown or not applicable. The data domain for the marital status column is: "M", "S".

In a normalized data model, the reference domain is typically specified in a reference table. Following the previous example, a Marital Status reference table would have exactly two records, one per allowed value—excluding NULL. Reference tables are formally related to other tables in a database by the use of foreign keys.

Simple domain boundary rules, if database-enforced, may be implemented through a check constraint or, in more complex cases, in a database trigger. For example, a column requiring positive numeric values may have a check constraint declaring that the values must be greater than zero.

This definition combines the concepts of domain as an area over which control is exercised and the mathematical idea of a set of values of an independent variable for which a function is defined, as in Domain of a function.

== See also ==
- Data modeling
- Reference data
- Master data management
- Database normalization
