= Truncate (SQL) =

Database command for removing data

In SQL, the TRUNCATE TABLE statement is a data manipulation language (DML) operation that deletes all rows of a table without causing a triggered action. The result of this operation quickly removes all data from a table, typically bypassing a number of integrity enforcing mechanisms. It was officially introduced in the SQL:2008 standard, as the optional feature F200, "TRUNCATE TABLE statement".

== Behavior ==
TRUNCATE TABLE removes all rows from a table, but the table structure and its columns, constraints, indexes, and so on remain. To remove the table definition in addition to its data, use the DROP TABLE statement.

The TRUNCATE TABLE mytable statement is logically (though not physically) equivalent to the DELETE FROM mytable statement (without a WHERE clause). The following characteristics distinguish TRUNCATE TABLE from DELETE:

- In the Oracle Database, TRUNCATE is implicitly preceded and followed by a commit operation. (This may also be the case in MySQL, when using a transactional storage engine.)
- Typically, TRUNCATE TABLE quickly deletes all records in a table by deallocating the data pages used by the table. This reduces the resource overhead of logging the deletions, as well as the number of locks acquired. Records removed this way cannot be restored in a rollback operation. Two notable exceptions to this rule are the implementations found in PostgreSQL and Microsoft SQL Server, both of which allow TRUNCATE TABLE statements to be committed or rolled back transactionally.
- It is not possible to specify a WHERE clause in a TRUNCATE TABLE statement.
- TRUNCATE TABLE cannot be used when a foreign key references the table to be truncated, since TRUNCATE TABLE statements do not fire triggers. This could result in inconsistent data because ON DELETE/ON UPDATE triggers would not fire.
- In some computer systems, TRUNCATE TABLE resets the count of an Identity column back to the identity's seed.

== DML/DDL ==
The SQL standard classifies TRUNCATE as a data change statement, synonymous with data manipulation (DML). This aligns with TRUNCATE being logically equivalent to an unconstrained DELETE operation.

However, some documents describe TRUNCATE as a data definition language (DDL) operation, because TRUNCATE may be seen as a combined DROP+CREATE operation.
