= IUD (disambiguation) =

An IUD is an intrauterine device, a form of birth control.

IUD may also refer to:

- Doctor of both laws, a scholar with doctorates in both civil and church law
- ICFAI University, Dehradun, a private university in Dehradun, India
- Industrial Union Department, a department of the AFL-CIO
- Insert, Update, and Delete SQL operations
