= Database object =

Defined object used to store or reference data

A database object is a structure for storing, managing and presenting application- or user-specific data in a database. Depending on the database management system (DBMS), many different types of database objects can exist. The following is a list of the most common types of database objects found in most relational databases (RDBMS):

- Tablespace, storage space for tables in a database
- Tables, a set of values organized into rows and columns
- Indexes, a data structure providing faster queries (at the expense of slower writing and storage to maintain the index structure)
- Views, a virtual table that is made as it is queried
- Synonyms, alternate names for a table, view, sequence or other object in a database
- Stored procedures and user-defined functions
- Triggers, procedures which are run automatically based on specific events
- Constraints, a constraint on the domain of an attribute
- User accounts, schemas and permissions

Database objects are permanent, which means that they remain in their form as long as they are not explicitly changed or deleted. Application- or user-specific database objects in relational databases are usually created with data definition language (DDL) commands, which in SQL for example can be CREATE, ALTER and DROP.

Rows or tuples from the database can represent objects in the sense of object-oriented programming, but are not considered database objects.
