= Sql insertion =

SQL Insertion may refer to:

- SQL insertion attack
- Insert (SQL), statement in SQL
