= SQL/Schemata =

The SQL/Schemata, or Information and Definition Schemas, part of the SQL standard is defined by ISO/IEC 9075-11:2008. SQL/Schemata defines the information schema and definition schema, providing a common set of tools to make SQL databases and objects self-describing. These tools include the SQL object identifier, structure and integrity constraints, security and authorization specifications, features and packages of ISO/IEC 9075, support of features provided by SQL-based DBMS implementations, SQL-based DBMS implementation information and sizing items, and the values supported by the DBMS implementations. SQL/Schemata defines a number of features, some of which are mandatory.

== See also ==
- Data Definition Language (CREATE, ALTER, DROP...)
- SQL:2003 (Introduced SQL/Schemata)
- Data dictionary
