= Firebird Foundation =

The Firebird Foundation is an organisation of individuals and companies of various sizes, working together as parts of a non-profit organisation that aims to ensure the continued development of the open source Firebird relational database and related products.

The dues paid by members play an important part in directly funding development of the Firebird engine.

== Sponsorships ==
In addition to the dues paid by members, sponsorship arrangements with individuals and companies form an important part of the revenue raised by the Foundation to allow it to carry out its objectives.

== Legally ==
Legally Firebird Foundation (Inc.) is a non-profit Association incorporated and registered in the state of New South Wales, Australia (certificate INC9878828).

== Management ==
The affairs of the Foundation are managed by a Management Committee which is elected annually during the Annual General Meeting, by voting members of the Foundation. The management committee governs in accordance with the rules of the association and is also mandated to create and delegate tasks to sub-committees as needs arise.

Meetings of the Foundation are generally conducted in an online forum.

Before incorporation, the affairs of the Foundation were managed by the FirebirdSQL Foundation Steering Group. This group elected officers and committee members to manage the affairs of the Foundation until the first Annual General Meeting, which took place in December 2002.

In June, 2005, by a special resolution, the name of the foundation was changed from its original name The FirebirdSQL Foundation.

== Objectives ==
According to the Foundation's website, its objectives are:

- To support and advance the development of the open source Firebird relational database engine.
- To provide the non-commercial infrastructure and mechanisms required to accept and manage funds raised; and disburse such funds to promote and advance the development effort.
- To encourage cooperation and affiliation with individuals, other non-profit organisations and commercial companies involved in, or planning to become involved in the development, support and promotion of Firebird software projects and associated products and activities.
