= Tablespace =

Storage location for database objects

A tablespace is a storage location where the actual data underlying database objects can be kept. It provides a layer of abstraction between physical and logical data, and serves to allocate storage for all DBMS managed segments. (A database segment is a database object which occupies physical space such as table data and indexes.) Once created, a tablespace can be referred to by name when creating database segments.

== Overview ==
Tablespaces specify only the database storage locations, not the logical database structure, or database schema. For instance, different objects in the same schema may have different underlying tablespaces. Similarly, a tablespace may service segments for more than one schema. Sometimes it can be used to specify schema so as to form a bond between logical and physical data.

By using tablespaces, an administrator also can control the disk layout of an installation. A common use of tablespaces is to optimize performance. For example, a heavily used index can be placed on a fast SSD. On the other hand, a database table which contains archived data that is rarely accessed could be stored on a less expensive but slower magnetic hard drive.

While it is common for tablespaces to store their data in a filesystem file, a single file must be part of a single tablespace. Some database management systems allow tablespaces to be configured directly over operating-system device entries, called raw devices, providing better performance by avoiding the OS filesystem overheads.

Oracle stores data logically in tablespaces and physically in datafiles associated with the corresponding tablespace.
