= Database schema =

Visual representation of database system relationships

MediaWiki 1.28.0 database schema. Many FOSS software tools allow modelling of DB layout/schemes like this. Visual representation often may also be exported as a production-ready source code made in DB-compatible languages like SQL.

The database schema is the structure of a database described in a formal language supported typically by a relational database management system (RDBMS). The term "schema" refers to the organization of data as a blueprint of how the database is constructed (divided into database tables in the case of relational databases). The formal definition of a database schema is a set of formulas (sentences) called integrity constraints imposed on a database. These integrity constraints ensure compatibility between parts of the schema. All constraints are expressible in the same language. A database can be considered a structure in realization of the database language. The states of a created conceptual schema are transformed into an explicit mapping, the database schema. This describes how real-world entities are modeled in the database.

"A database schema specifies, based on the database administrator's knowledge of possible applications, the facts that can enter the database, or those of interest to the possible end-users." The notion of a database schema plays the same role as the notion of theory in predicate calculus. A model of this "theory" closely corresponds to a database, which can be seen at any instant of time as a mathematical object. Thus a schema can contain formulas representing integrity constraints specifically for an application and the constraints specifically for a type of database, all expressed in the same database language. In a relational database, the schema defines the tables, fields, relationships, views, indexes, packages, procedures, functions, queues, triggers, types, sequences, materialized views, synonyms, database links, directories, XML schemas, and other elements.

A database generally stores its schema in a data dictionary. Although a schema is defined in text database language, the term is often used to refer to a graphical depiction of the database structure. In other words, schema is the structure of the database that defines the objects in the database.

In an Oracle Database system, the term "schema" has a slightly different connotation.

== Ideal requirements for schema integration ==
The requirements listed below influence the detailed structure of schemas that are produced. Certain applications will not require that all of these conditions are met, but these four requirements are the most ideal.

Overlap preservation
Each of the overlapping elements specified in the input mapping is also in a database schema relation.

Extended overlap preservation
Source-specific elements that are associated with a source’s overlapping elements are passed through to the database schema.

Normalization
Independent entities and relationships in the source data should not be grouped together in the same relation in the database schema. In particular, source specific schema elements should not be grouped with overlapping schema elements, if the grouping co-locates independent entities or relationships.

Minimality
If any elements of the database schema are dropped then the database schema is not ideal.

== Example of two schema integrations ==
Suppose we want a mediated schema to integrate two travel databases, Go-travel and Ok-flight.

Go-travel has two relations:

Go-flight(flight-number, time, meal(yes/no))
Go-price(flight-number, date, price)

Ok-flight has just one relation:

Ok-flight(flight-number, date, time, price, nonstop(yes/no))

The overlapping information in Go-travel’s and Ok-flight’s schemas could be represented in a mediated schema:

Flight(flight-number, date, time, price)

== Oracle database specificity ==
In the context of Oracle Databases, a schema object is a logical data storage structure.

An Oracle database associates a separate schema with each database user. A schema comprises a collection of schema objects. Examples of schema objects include:

- tables
- views
- sequences
- synonyms
- indexes
- clusters
- database links
- snapshots
- procedures
- functions
- packages

On the other hand, non-schema objects may include:

- users
- roles
- contexts
- directory objects

Schema objects do not have a one-to-one correspondence to physical files on disk that store their information. However, Oracle databases store schema objects logically within a tablespace of the database. The data of each object is physically contained in one or more of the tablespace's datafiles. For some objects (such as tables, indexes, and clusters) a database administrator can specify how much disk space the Oracle RDBMS allocates for the object within the tablespace's datafiles.

There is no necessary relationship between schemas and tablespaces: a tablespace can contain objects from different schemas, and the objects for a single schema can reside in different tablespaces. Oracle database specificity does, however, enforce platform recognition of nonhomogenized sequence differentials, which is considered a crucial limiting factor in virtualized applications.

== Microsoft SQL Server ==
In Microsoft SQL Server, the default schema of every database is the dbo schema.

== See also ==
- Data element
- Data mapping
- Data model
- Database design
- Database model
- Entity–relationship model
- Knowledge representation and reasoning
- Object-role modeling
- Olog
- Schema matching
- Three-schema approach
