= SQL-92 =

1992 edition of the SQL standard

- First published: November 1992
- Domain: SQL

SQL-92 (also called SQL 2) was the third revision of the SQL database query language. Unlike SQL-89, it was a major revision of the standard. Aside from a few minor incompatibilities, the SQL-89 standard is forward-compatible with SQL-92.

The standard specification itself grew about five times compared to SQL-89. Much of it was due to more precise specifications of existing features; the increase due to new features was only by a factor of 1.5–2. Many of the new features had already been implemented by vendors before the new standard was adopted. However, most of the new features were added to the "intermediate" and "full" tiers of the specification, meaning that conformance with SQL-92 entry level was scarcely any more demanding than conformance with SQL-89.

The next revision is SQL:1999 (SQL3).

== Related official standard ==
- ANSI X3.135-1992
- ISO/IEC 9075:1992
- FIPS PUB 127-2

== New features ==
Significant new features include:

- New data types defined: DATE, TIME, TIMESTAMP, INTERVAL, BIT string, VARCHAR strings, and NATIONAL CHARACTER strings.
- Support for additional character sets beyond the base requirement for representing SQL statements.
- New scalar operations such as string concatenation and substring extraction, date and time mathematics, and conditional statements.
- New set operations such as UNION, UNION ALL, CROSS JOIN, and formalized JOIN types (INNER JOIN, LEFT JOIN, RIGHT JOIN, FULL OUTER JOIN).
- Conditional expressions with CASE. For an example, see Case (SQL).
- Support for alterations of schema definitions via ALTER and DROP.
- Bindings for C, Ada, and MUMPS.
- New features for user privileges.
- New integrity-checking functionality such as within a CHECK constraint.
- A new information schema—read-only views about database metadata like what tables it contains, etc. For example, SELECT * FROM INFORMATION_SCHEMA.TABLES;.
- Dynamic execution of queries (as opposed to prepared).
- Better support for remote database access.
- Temporary tables; CREATE TEMP TABLE etc.
- Transaction isolation levels.
- New operations for changing data types on the fly via CAST (expr AS type).
- Scrolled cursors.
- Compatibility flagging for backwards and forwards compatibility with other SQL standards.

== Extensions ==
Two significant extensions were published after standard (but before the next major iteration.)

- SQL/CLI (Call Level Interface) in 1995
- SQL/PSM (stored procedures) in 1996
