= Delete (SQL) =

SQL statement

In the database structured query language (SQL), the DELETE statement is used to remove one or more rows from a table. A subset may be defined for deletion using a condition, otherwise all records are removed. Some database management systems (DBMSs), like MySQL, allow deletion of rows from multiple tables with one DELETE statement (this is sometimes called multi-table DELETE).

It is not possible to delete individual values using DELETE, instead UPDATE should be used to set the value to NULL. Backups should always be created before using DELETE.

== Examples ==
Delete rows from table pies where column flavor equals Lemon Meringue:

DELETE FROM pies
 WHERE flavor='Lemon Meringue';

Delete rows in trees, if the value of height is smaller than 80.

DELETE FROM trees
 WHERE height < 80;

Delete all rows from mytable:

DELETE FROM mytable;

Delete rows from mytable using a subquery in the where condition:

DELETE FROM mytable
 WHERE id IN (
       SELECT id
         FROM mytable2
      );

Delete rows from mytable using a list of values:

DELETE FROM mytable
 WHERE id IN (
       value1,
       value2,
       value3,
       value4,
       value5
      );

== Example with related tables ==
Suppose there is a simple database that lists people and addresses. More than one person can live at a particular address and a person can live at more than one address (this is an example of a many-to-many relationship). The database only has three tables, person, address, and pa, with the following data:

person
pid	name
1	Joe
2	Bob
3	Ann

address
aid	description
100	2001 Main St.
200	35 Pico Blvd.

pa
pid	aid
1	100
2	100
3	100
1	200

The pa table relates the person and address tables, showing that Joe, Bob and Ann all live at 2001 Main Street, but Joe also takes up residence on Pico Boulevard.

In order to remove joe from the database, two deletes must be executed:

 DELETE FROM person WHERE pid=1;
 DELETE FROM pa WHERE pid=1;

To maintain referential integrity, Joe's records must be removed from both person and pa. It could be that beyond just having three tables, the database also has been set up with a trigger so that whenever a row is deleted from person any linked rows would be deleted from pa. Then the first statement:

 DELETE FROM person WHERE pid=1;

would automatically trigger the second:

 DELETE FROM pa WHERE pid=1;

== Features ==
- It is a DML (Data Manipulation Language) command, therefore the following commands are used for this command: COMMIT and ROLLBACK
- Deletes all or some records from the table, you can limit the records to be deleted by using the WHERE clause
- Does not free the space occupied by the data in the table (in the TABLESPACE)
- Does not reset the SEQUENCE value assigned to the table
- DELETE works much slower than TRUNCATE
- You can undo the operation of removing records by using the ROLLBACK command
- DELETE requires a shared table lock
- Triggers fire
- DELETE can be used in the case of: database link
- DELETE returns the number of records deleted
- Transaction log - DELETE needs to read records, check constraints, update block, update indexes, and generate redo / undo. All of this takes time, hence it takes time much longer than with TRUNCATE
- reduces performance during execution - each record in the table is locked for deletion
- DELETE uses more transaction space than the TRUNCATE statement
- DELETE can be used with indexed views
- DELETE generates a small amount of redo and a large amount of undo
- DELETE operation does not make unusable indexes usable again

== Related commands ==
Deleting all rows from a table can be very time-consuming. Some DBMS offer a TRUNCATE TABLE command that works a lot quicker, as it only alters metadata and typically does not spend time enforcing constraints or firing triggers.

DELETE only deletes the rows. For deleting a table entirely the DROP command can be used.
