= Column (database) =

Data values in computer science

In a relational database, a column is a set of data values of a particular type, one value for each row of a table. A column may contain text values, numbers, or even pointers to files in the operating system. Columns typically contain simple types, though some relational database systems allow columns to contain more complex data types, such as whole documents, images, or even video clips. A column can also be called an attribute.

Each row would provide a data value for each column and would then be understood as a single structured data value. For example, a database that represents company contact information might have the following columns: ID, Company Name, Address Line 1, Address Line 2, City, and Postal Code. More formally, a row is a tuple containing a specific value for each column, for example: (1234, 'Big Company Inc.', '123 East Example Street', '456 West Example Drive', 'Big City', 98765).

== Field ==
The word 'field' is normally used interchangeably with 'column'. However, database perfectionists tend to favor using 'field' to signify a specific cell of a given row. This is to enable accuracy in communicating with other developers. Columns (really column names) being referred to as field names (common for each row/record in the table). Then a field refers to a single storage location in a specific record (like a cell) to store one value (the field value). The terms record and field come from the more practical field of database usage and traditional DBMS system usage (This was linked into business like terms used in manual databases e.g. filing cabinet storage with records for each customer). The terms row and column come from the more theoretical study of relational theory.

Another distinction between the terms 'column' and 'field' is that the term 'column' does not apply to certain databases, for instance key-value stores, that do not conform to the traditional relational database structure.

== See also ==
- Column-oriented DBMS, optimization for column-centric queries
- Column (data store), a similar object used in distributed data stores
- Row (database)
- SQL
- Query language
- Column groups and row groups
