= Pervasive =

Pervasive may refer to:

- Pervasive Computing, human computer interaction paradigm
- Pervasive Informatics, study of how information affects human interactions
- Pervasive Software, software company in the United States
  - Pervasive PSQL, software developed by the company
- Pervasive games, games that blend with the physical world
- Pervasive developmental disorder, group of disorders characterized by delayed development of basic body functions

== See also ==
- Pervasiveness (disambiguation)
