= PSQL =

PSQL can refer to:

- Pervasive PSQL, a proprietary DBMS optimized for embedding in applications
- psql (PostgreSQL), an interactive terminal-based front-end to PostgreSQL
- Procedural SQL, procedural programming extensions to Structured Query Language (SQL)
