= WindowBase =

- Original author: Software Products International
- Release: 1991; 35 years ago
- Operating system: Microsoft Windows
- Platform: x86
- Type: Database management system
- License: Proprietary commercial software

WindowBase was a database management system created by Software Products International (SPI) as the successor to its manager for MS-DOS, Open Access. Introduced in 1991, it was launched in Europe in 1992. It cost $495 ($695 with the SDK for C).

The program incorporated functionalities such as a SDK for C and C++ and support for SQL. The interface offered, among other features: personalization of menus; tools for creating graphical representations of its output; predefined groups of screen and print formats; and context sensitive help. Data could be exported to or imported from the dBase format, Btrieve format, or SPI's own Open Access format. In monoposition, it was compatible with the Microsoft SQL Server.
