= Data access =

Generic term for data management

Data access is a generic term referring to a process which has both an IT-specific meaning and other connotations involving access rights in a broader legal and/or political sense. In the former it typically refers to software and activities related to storing, retrieving, or acting on data housed in a database or other repository.

== Details ==
Two fundamental types of data access exist:

1. sequential access (as in magnetic tape, for example)
2. random access (as in indexed media)

Data access crucially involves authorization to access different data repositories. Data access can help distinguish the abilities of administrators and users. For example, administrators may have the ability to remove, edit and add data, while general users may not even have "read" rights if they lack access to particular information.

Historically, each repository (including each different database, file system, etc.), might require the use of different methods and languages, and many of these repositories stored their content in different and incompatible formats.

Over the years standardized languages, methods, and formats, have developed to serve as interfaces between the often proprietary, and always idiosyncratic, specific languages and methods. Such standards include SQL (1974- ), ODBC (ca 1990- ), JDBC, XQJ, ADO.NET, XML, XQuery, XPath (1999- ), and Web Services.

Some of these standards enable translation of data from unstructured (such as HTML or free-text files) to structured (such as XML or SQL).

Structures such as connection strings and DBURLs can attempt to standardise methods of connecting to databases.

== See also ==
- Right of access to personal data
- Data access object
- Data access layer
