= Simba Technologies =

Software company in Canada

Simba, by insightsoftware.
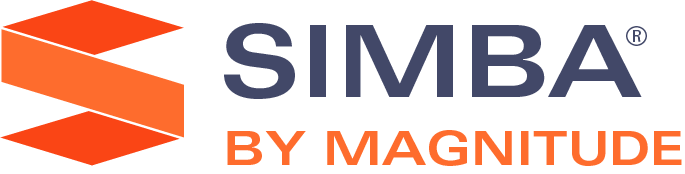
- Company type: Subsidiary
- Founded: 1991; 35 years ago
- Headquarters: Raleigh, North Carolina, United States
- Key people: Michael Sullivan (CEO), Jay Allardyce (GM), Sami Akbay (VP Product)
- Products: Enterprise ODBC/JDBC Drivers, Custom Driver SDK, Managed Connectivity Services
- Parent: insightsoftware
- Website: insightsoftware.com/simba/

Simba (formerly Simba Technologies Inc.) is a software company specializing in solutions for ODBC and JDBC data drivers. Originally founded in 1991 as PageAhead Software in Vancouver, British Columbia, Simba co-developed the first standards-based ODBC driver with Microsoft. The company was acquired by Magnitude Software in 2016, and became part of insightsoftware, a Raleigh–based enterprise software company, following insightsoftware’s acquisition of Magnitude in November 2021. Simba now operates as the data connectivity division of insightsoftware, with continued engineering and business operations based in Canada and the United States.

== Products ==
Simba provides data connectivity solutions, offering software development kits (SDKs) and prebuilt drivers that enable data access across applications and platforms. Its flagship offering, the SimbaEngine X SDK, allows developers to build custom ODBC and JDBC drivers for a wide variety of data sources, including relational databases, cloud platforms, and big data systems.

Simba drivers are embedded in many business intelligence and analytics platforms, including Microsoft Power BI, Tableau, Google BigQuery, Amazon Redshift, Databricks, and Snowflake. The technology also supports Logi Symphony, an embedded analytics platform from insightsoftware.

Simba has a history of early innovation, including releasing the first ODBC driver for Apache Hive in 2012, which enabled SQL-based access to Hadoop environments. Today, Simba develops and maintains drivers for both cloud-native and on-premises systems.

== Services ==
Simba offers prebuilt ODBC and JDBC drivers that enable access to a wide variety of data sources, including relational databases, cloud platforms, and big data systems. In addition to its commercial driver portfolio, Simba provides integration and driver development services with a focus on original equipment manufacturer (OEM) solutions.

The company develops custom and white-labeled drivers for software vendors and enterprise applications, and also performs certification and compatibility testing to ensure compliance with analytics and data processing tools. Supported platforms include Tableau, Microsoft Excel, and other business intelligence environments.

== History ==
Simba was founded in 1991 under the name PageAhead Software, with offices in Vancouver, British Columbia, and Seattle, Washington. In 1992, the company collaborated with Microsoft to co-develop the first standards-based ODBC driver, known as Simba.DLL, which was included in Microsoft Windows 3.1. The company was renamed Simba Technologies in 1995 and began focusing on data connectivity toolkits and driver development.

Throughout the 1990s and early 2000s, Simba expanded its offerings to include toolkits for JDBC, OLE DB, and XMLA, and collaborated with companies such as Oracle, SAP, and Attachmate on data access technologies.

In 2012, Simba developed one of the first ODBC drivers for Apache Hive, enabling SQL-based access to Hadoop data sources.

Simba was acquired by Magnitude Software in 2016, and became part of insightsoftware in 2021 following its acquisition of Magnitude. Today, Simba operates as the data connectivity division of insightsoftware, supporting a wide range of platforms in analytics, business intelligence, and data engineering.

In 1993, the company was the first to introduce an ODBC Software Development Kit SDK to build custom ODBC drivers allowing users to use standard-compliant Business Intelligence BI applications and platforms, such as PowerBI, Microsoft Excel, Tableau, Alteryx and SAP BusinessObjects for analysis and reporting.

In 2012 Simba Technologies developed an ODBC driver for Hadoop/Hive Big Data sources. The ODBC 3.52 driver enables users to directly access and analyse Big Data sources, using the BI tool of their choice.

== Timeline ==
- 1991 – PageAhead Software is founded in Vancouver, British Columbia, and Seattle, Washington.
- 1992 – Microsoft partners with PageAhead to develop Simba ODBC.
- 1993 – Microsoft includes Simba technology in Windows 3.1.
- 1995 – PageAhead Software changes its name to Simba Technologies.
- 2012 – Simba releases the first ODBC driver for Apache Hive.
- 2016 – Magnitude Software acquires Simba Technologies.
- 2019 – SimbaEngine X SDK receives performance improvements and extended support for cloud-native platforms, including Snowflake and Google BigQuery.
- 2020 – Simba positioned as the enterprise data connectivity layer within Magnitude’s analytics and ERP product ecosystem.
- 2021 – insightsoftware acquires Magnitude Software, integrating Simba into its portfolio.
- 2024 – insightsoftware releases Simba Workday Drivers for real-time data integration with Workday.
