= DQA =

DQA may refer to:

- Data Quality Act, US
- Daqing Sartu Airport (IATA code), China
- Maldivian (airline) (ICAO code), the Maldives
  - Island Aviation Services (ICAO code), the parent company; See List of airline codes
- Data Query Assistant, in Lotus DataLens
