= SafeCatch =

Counter criminal strategy invented by the FBI

SafeCatch is a counter-criminal strategy invented by the FBI, to be adopted by bank tellers in the event of a robbery. The method focuses attention in the guise of good customer service and allows bank tellers to rattle robbers, who generally try to remain anonymous and may not be expecting an overwhelmingly positive reaction to their robbery attempt, thereby possibly deterring them from going further with their plan.

SafeCatch was developed by the Seattle FBI office, and has been implemented in the Seattle banking system, with staff trained in 23 banks.

== Efficacy ==
While the efficacy of the program is challenging to quantify over the short term, the FBI and area banks note that, in the first quarter of 2007, Seattle bank robberies were down to 40, from a 10-year average of 80, and in the month of April, 2007, bank robberies were down by 70%.

The “Safe” in SafeCatch is an acronym, denoting Scan (for suspicious persons) Alert (relevant personnel and help) Friendly, neutral confrontation Escape (by the perpetrator shouldn't be the end of the situation).
