= Techsource =

Conversion of a task to be performed entirely by machines

Techsource involves the automation, or conversion of a task or job from a manual task performed by a person, to a job performed entirely by machines. The concept of "techsourcing" has occurred across many industries for many years, however the phrase was coined by George Tosh, Principal Software Engineer for Salesforce in 2016. Techsourcing might include the use of robotics, or dedicated purpose-built machines to complete a task, but not always.

A popular example of techsourcing is the ATM or “Automated Teller Machine”. The ATM performs many of the tasks that human bank tellers performed. It has allowed banks and other financial institutions to increase customer satisfaction through decreased wait times, but often at the cost of job opportunities for humans. Techsourcing usually occurs for jobs and roles that cannot be outsourced due to the specific nature of the job.

In 2015, and continuing into 2016, the push for a $15/hour minimum wage among many minimum wage earners has increased fears among economists that increasing the minimum wage will only lead to jobs being “techsourced”, automated, or eliminated entirely. Minimum wage jobs are not the only jobs at risk for being techsourced. In Belgium two hospitals have employed robots as receptionists to offer directions and assist patients, jobs that previously would have been filled by humans.
