= Teller assist unit =

Teller assist units (TAU), also known as automatic teller safes (ATS) or teller cash dispensers (TCD), are devices used in retail banking for the disbursement of money at a bank teller wicket or a centralized area. Other areas of application of TAU include the automation of starting and reconciling teller or cashier drawers (tills) in retail, check cashing, payday loan / advance, grocery, and casino operations.

Cash supplies are held in a vault or safe. Disbursements and acceptance of money take place by means of inputting information through a separate computer to the cash dispensing mechanism inside the vault, which is similar in construction to an automatic teller machine vault.

A TAU provides a secure and auditable way of handling large amounts of cash by tellers without undue risk from robbery. Some TAUs can be networked and monitored remotely, from a central location – thereby reducing oversight and management resources.

== Special security considerations ==
TAUs may delay dispensing of large amounts of money up to minutes to discourage bank robberies. It is however very likely that someone present on the premises has the means to open the cash vault of the device. TAUs may be accessed by keys, combination, or a mix of the two.

== Construction ==
A TAU consists of:

- A vault
- Cash handling mechanism
- Alarm sensors

In the TAU's cash handling mechanisms are several money cartridges. These can be equipped with different cash notes or coinage. The input into the controlling computer makes possible for this unit to disburse the correct amounts. Notes are tested to ensure that they are removed correctly from the cartridges and that no surplus notes are removed. False disbursements are possible, although very rare. Modern TAUs can be used also for depositing and recycling of banknotes. They use bill validation technology to help ensure the authenticity and fitness of the received cash before it is accepted and recycled to be presented to the customer.

== Differences from ATMs ==
TAUs are distinct from ATMs "in that they are designed to be operated solely by trained branch personnel, they do not integrate directly into interbank networks, and are usually controlled by a computer that is not directly integrated into the overall construction of the unit."

== TAU software ==
TAUs can be provided with CEN/XFS drivers.

== Major TAU manufacturers worldwide ==
- Diebold
- NCR
- Wincor Nixdorf
