= Windows Open Services Architecture =

Windows Open Services Architecture (WOSA) is a set of proprietary Microsoft technologies intended to "...provide a single, open-ended interface to enterprise computing environments.". WOSA was announced by Microsoft in 1992. WOSA was pitched as a set of programming interfaces designed to provide application interoperability across the Windows environment.

The set of technologies that were part of the WOSA initiative include:

- LSAPI (Software Licensing API)
- MAPI (Mail Application Programming Interface)
- ODBC (Open Database Connectivity)
- OLE for Process Control
- SAPI (Speech Application Programming Interface)
- TAPI (Telephony Application Programming Interface)
- Windows SNA (IBM SNA Networks)
- WOSA/XFS (WOSA for Financial Services)
- WOSA/XRT (WOSA for Real-time Market Data)

== See also ==
- Component Object Model
- Object Linking and Embedding
