= Scott Klement =

American computer scientist

Scott Klement, January 28, 1969 - November 4, 2026, born in Milwaukee, Wisconsin, was an American computer scientist, author, and speaker recognized as a top evangelist for IBM i on IBM Power Systems computers. For twenty-eight years, Scott served as the IT Director of family owned Klement's Sausage, which was sold to Altamont Capital Partners in 2014. In 2012 he left to work for Profound Logic Corporation. Scott was a member of the Strategic Education Team (SET) and a Subject Matter Expert (SME) at COMMON, the largest association of users of IBM compatible technology in the world. He developed numerous frameworks and other open-source development tools, often works that make other technology accessible to the IBM i technology directly from RPG. Many developments by others, including Thomas Raddatz as well as IBM itself, make use of Klement's software in products of their own. His work in developing tools which open the i is widely quoted by others, including sockets and other tools in the book Hacking iSeries, and UNIXCMD, which allows PHP to access UNIX commands from a script. In addition, Klement was a frequent contributor to various Penton Media trade magazines.

== Personal ==
Scott resided in Milwaukee, Wisconsin, with his wife and son. He was an avid player of the sheepshead card game. He was also a mentor for FRC Team 2506 Saber Robotics at Franklin High School (Wisconsin).

On October 26, 2026, Scott suffered a medical emergency while attending the IBM TechXchange Conference in Atlanta, Georgia, from which he did not recover and passed away on November 4, 2026 as reported on the Midrange.com mailing list.

== Awards ==
In 2005, Klement was awarded the Intellectual Solutions Award by IBM and COMMON for his website, which provided multiple tutorials and open source software to the IBM i community. He also received the Gary Guthrie Award for Excellence in Technical Writing and the silver medal for Best Feature Series by the American Society of Business Publication Editors (ASBPE). Klement's skill is recognized as one of the best in the industry. In 2012 Klement, along with Jim Buck and Aaron Bartell, was named a "Champion of Power" by IBM for their contributions to the Power Systems community. He has been called "The most interesting man in the RPG world". In 2023, he was the first inducted to the Common Europe "Hall of Fame" for his contributions to the IBM i world.

== Partial list of frameworks and open-source projects ==
Category	Title/Description	References
Base 64 encode-decode	service program to encode/decode Base64	
EXPAT XML Parser	a port of the open-source Expat XML parser to i	
FTPAPI	Programmatic granular control of FTP on i	
HSSFR4	A service program simplifying use of POI to read and write Excel from RPG	
HTTPAPI	Consuming SOAP and RESTful Web Services in RPG	
JDBCR4	JDBC driven by RPG	
JSON	ported Yet another JSON Compiler (YAJL)	
Linux Tn5250	An open-source 5250 emulator for Linux, FreeBSD, etc.	
SNTP Program	Time syncer	
UNIXCMD	Run PASE or Qshell commands from CL or RPG	
