= ADO.NET =

Data access software from Microsoft .NET Framework

- Developer: Microsoft
- Operating system: Microsoft Windows
- Type: Software framework
- License: Proprietary software (BCL portion under MIT license; source code under Ms-RSL)
- Website: docs.microsoft.com/dotnet/framework/data/adonet/

ADO.NET is a data access technology from the Microsoft .NET Framework and .NET that provides communication between relational and non-relational systems through a common set of components. ADO.NET is a set of computer software components that programmers can use to access data and data services from a database. It is a part of the base class library that is included with the Microsoft .NET Framework. It is commonly used by programmers to access and modify data stored in relational database systems, though it can also access data in non-relational data sources. ADO.NET is sometimes considered an evolution of ActiveX Data Objects (ADO) technology, but was changed so extensively that it can be considered an entirely new product.

== Architecture ==
This technology forms a part of .NET Framework 3.0 (having been part of the framework since version 1.0)

ADO.NET is conceptually divided into consumers and data providers. The consumers are the applications that need access to the data, and the providers are the software components that implement the interface and thereby provide the data to the consumer.

Functionality exists in Visual Studio IDE to create specialized subclasses of the DataSet classes for a particular database schema, allowing convenient access to each field in the schema through strongly typed properties. This helps catch more programming errors at compile-time and enhances the IDE's Intellisense feature.

A provider is a software component that interacts with a data source. ADO.NET data providers are analogous to ODBC drivers, JDBC drivers, and OLE DB providers.

ADO.NET providers can be created to access such simple data stores as a text file and spreadsheet, through to such complex databases as Oracle Database, Microsoft SQL Server, MySQL, PostgreSQL, SQLite, IBM Db2, Sybase ASE, and many others. They can also provide access to hierarchical data stores such as email systems.

Third-party ADO.NET-based providers, such as dotConnect, further enhance this model by introducing additional classes and extended functionality beyond the standard ADO.NET implementation. These providers optimize data access, optimize performance, and offer developers capabilities for building custom connectors. These connecters can integrate with external systems, including CRM platforms, accounting applications, and e-commerce solutions, enabling efficient, automated data exchange and streamlining complex business workflows.

Because different data store technologies can have different capabilities, every ADO.NET provider cannot implement every possible interface available in the ADO.NET standard. Microsoft describes the availability of an interface as "provider-specific," as it may not be applicable depending on the data store technology involved. Providers may augment the capabilities of a data store; these capabilities are known as "services" in Microsoft parlance.

== Object–relational mapping ==
=== Entity Framework ===
Entity Framework (EF) is an open source object-relational mapping (ORM) framework for ADO.NET, part of .NET Framework. It is a set of technologies in ADO.NET that supports the development of data-oriented software applications. Architects and developers of data-oriented applications have typically struggled with the need to achieve two very different objectives. The Entity Framework enables developers to work with data in the form of domain-specific objects and properties, such as customers and customer addresses, without having to concern themselves with the underlying database tables and columns where this data is stored. With the Entity Framework, developers can work at a higher level of abstraction when they deal with data, and can create and maintain data-oriented applications with less code than in traditional applications.

=== LINQ to SQL ===
LINQ to SQL (formerly called DLINQ) allows LINQ to be used to query Microsoft SQL Server databases, including SQL Server Compact databases. Since SQL Server data may reside on a remote server, and because SQL Server has its own query engine, it does not use the query engine of LINQ. Instead, the LINQ query is converted to a SQL query that is then sent to SQL Server for processing. Since SQL Server stores the data as relational data and LINQ works with data encapsulated in objects, the two representations must be mapped to one another. For this reason, LINQ to SQL also defines a mapping framework. The mapping is done by defining classes that correspond to the tables in the database, and containing all or a certain subset of the columns in the table as data members.
