= Pervasiveness =

Pervasiveness generally refers to something being present in all parts of a particular thing or place, and is used as a term in:

- Pervasiveness doctrine
- Pervasive developmental disorder, emphasizing the affection of multiple basic functions affected
