= Lotus DataLens =

Lotus Development's DataLens, originally known as Blueprint, was a standardized system for database queries used in a number of Lotus products, notably 1-2-3. It provided drivers for a number of common data sources, including a variety of mainframe SQL servers, microcomputer database files of various sorts, and even flat-file systems. Drivers from 3rd parties were also available.

Unlike the better-known ODBC, DataLens did not use SQL in the query interface. The API was based on a variety of data structures that were interpreted by the database drivers into their own internal query format - including SQL in some cases. In contrast, ODBC used SQL as its basic interface, and interpreted and translated it in the driver for those data sources that did not use SQL.

Lotus also released two user-oriented query builders, the DOS-based Query Builder which could interact with DataLens sources but was not built on it, and the Windows-based Data Query Assistant (DQA) which was built directly on DataLens.
