= Pervasive Software =

Pervasive Software Inc.
- Industry: Software, RDBMS, Data integration
- Founded: 1994
- Defunct: 2013
- Fate: Acquired by Actian (2013; 13 years ago)
- Headquarters: Austin, Texas
- Products: Pervasive Data Integrator; Pervasive DataRush; Pervasive Data Profiler; Pervasive PSQL
- Revenue: $47.2 million USD (Fiscal 2010)
- Website: www.pervasive.com

Pervasive Software was a company that developed software including database management systems and extract, transform and load tools. Pervasive Data Integrator and Pervasive Data Profiler are integration products, and the Pervasive PSQL relational database management system is its primary data storage product. These embeddable data management products deliver integration between corporate data, third-party applications and custom software.

Pervasive Software was headquartered in Austin, Texas, and sold its products with partners in other countries. The company is involved in cloud computing through DataSolutions and its DataCloud offering along with its long-standing relationship with salesforce.com. It was acquired by Actian Corp. in April 2013.

== History ==
Pervasive started in 1982 as SoftCraft developing the database management system technology Btrieve. Acquired by Novell in 1987, in January 1994 Pervasive spun out as Btrieve Technologies. The company name was changed to Pervasive Software in June 1996. Their initial public offering in 1997 raised $18.6 million. Ron R. Harris was chief executive and founder Nancy R. Woodward was chairman of the board of directors (the other co-founder was her husband Douglas Woodward). Its shares were listed on the Nasdaq exchange under symbol PVSW. Its database product was announced in 1999 as Pervasive.SQL version 7, and later renamed PSQL. PSQL implemented the atomicity, consistency, isolation, durability properties known as ACID using a relational database model.

In 1998, Pervasive acquired Canadian web tools developer EveryWare Development for CA$16,232,00, shutting down EveryWare's Mac-only database server Butler SQL and continuing support for their Tango web development environment and Bolero website tracking software. Pervasive sold the Tango technology to Australian company Witango in 2001.

In August 2003, Pervasive agreed to acquire Data Junction Corporation, makers of data and application integration tools renamed Pervasive Data Integrator, for about $51.7 million in cash and stock shares. Data Junction, founded in 1984, was a privately held company also headquartered in Austin. The merger closed in December 2003.

Pervasive also acquired business-to-business data interchange service Channelinx in August 2009. Based in Greenville, South Carolina, it continued operating under the name Pervasive Business Xchange. In February 2011, Pervasive announced version 5 of DataRush, which included integration with the MapReduce programming model of Apache Hadoop.

In 2013, Pervasive Software was acquired by Actian Corporation for $161.9 million. Actian had initially made offers in August 2012 starting at $154 million 30% higher than its shares traded at the time, and raised its price in November. Pervasive agreed to the deal in January 2013, and it closed in April.

== Products ==
=== PSQL ===
Pervasive PSQL, also known as Pervasive.PSQL or simply PSQL (originally Btrieve) is a DBMS for embedded applications. There were four editions of Pervasive PSQL: PSQL Client, PSQL Workgroup, PSQL Server, and PSQL Vx Server.

- PSQL Client is designed for use with PSQL Server and PSQL Vx Server in a client-server network.
- PSQL Workgroup edition is intended for single- and multi-engine configurations with up to five users.
- PSQL Server edition is intended for configurations that have at minimum ten concurrent connections and it is scalable up to thousands of concurrent network users in client-server network and web-based applications on the enterprise level.
- PSQL Vx Server runs under hypervisors in a VM environment. It is designed for customers “who need support for highly virtualized environments enabling live migration, fault tolerance, high availability and cloud computing.”

=== DataRush ===
DataRush is a dataflow parallel programming framework in the Java programming language. DataRush was announced in December 2006 and shipped in 2009.
