= Bank teller =

Customer-facing bank employee

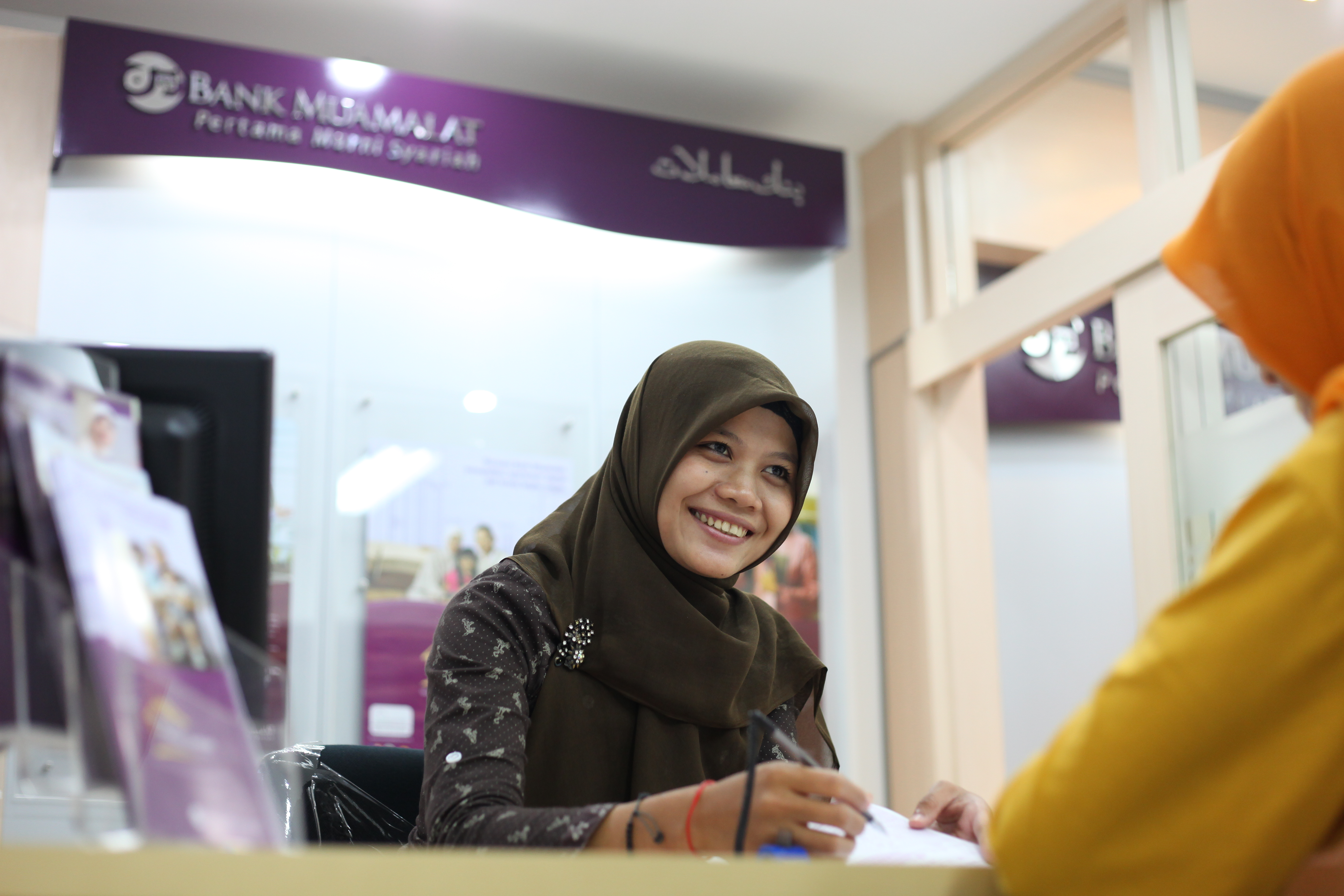
A teller (Tia W.) in a branch of Bank Muamalat, Indonesia

A bank teller (North American English) or a bank clerk (British English, Australian English and New Zealand English) (often abbreviated to simply teller or clerk) is an employee of a bank whose responsibilities include the handling of customer cash and negotiable instruments. In some places, this employee is known as a cashier or customer representative. Tellers also deal with routine customer service at a branch.

== Responsibilities and duties of the bank teller ==
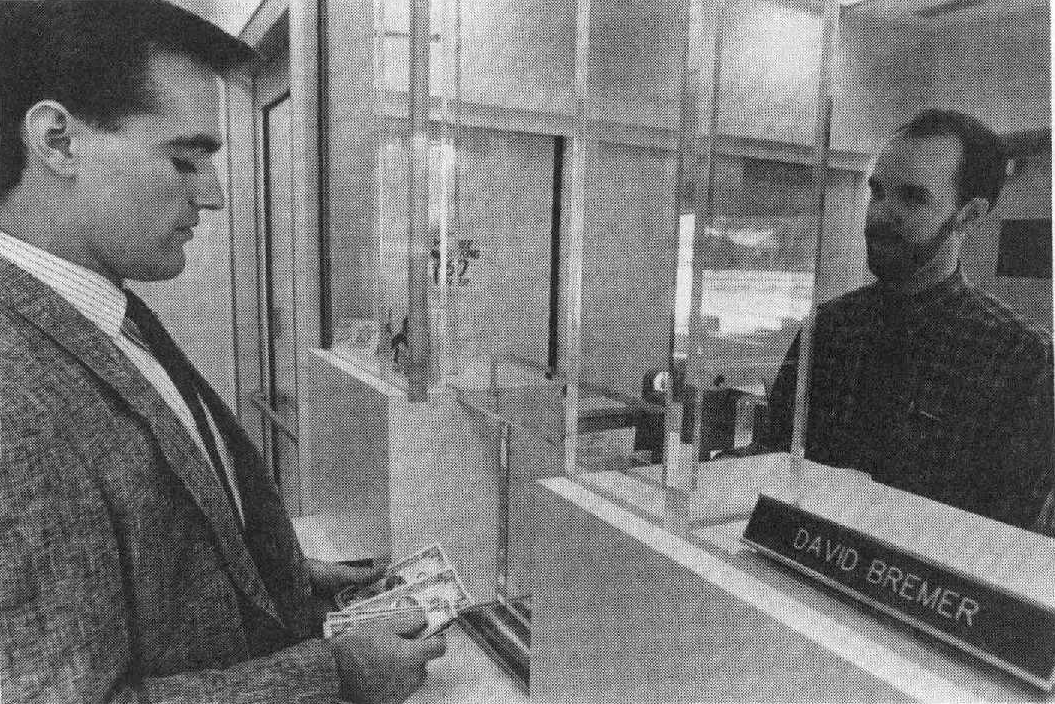
Bank teller at work. (1992)

Being front-line staff they are most likely to detect and stop fraudulent transactions in order to prevent losses at a bank (counterfeit currency and cheques, identity theft, confidence tricks, etc.). The position also requires tellers to be friendly and interact with the customers, providing them with information about customers' accounts and bank services. Tellers typically work from a station, usually located on a teller line. Most stations have a teller system, which includes cash drawers, receipt validator/printers, proof work sorters, and paperwork used for completing bank transactions. These transactions include:

- Check cashing, depositing, transfers, wire transfers
- Savings deposits, withdrawals
- Issuing negotiable items (cashier's checks, traveler's cheques, money orders, federal draft issuances, etc.)
- Payment collecting
- Promotion of the financial institution's products (loans, mortgages, etc.)
- Facilitating applications for retail credit products (short-term financing, credit cards, etc.)
- Business referrals (trust, insurance, lending, etc.)
- Cash advances
- Savings bond redemption
- Resolving customer issues
- Balancing the vault, cash drawers, ATMs, and TAUs
- Batching and Processing Proof Work (on-us/not-on-us checks, payment coupons, counter slips, etc.)
- May include ordering products for the customer (cheques, deposit slips, etc.)

== Prevalence and history ==
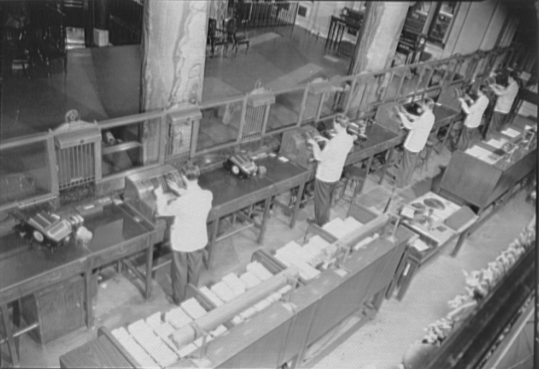
Tellers at machines at the Bowery Savings Bank, 34th St. and 5th Ave., New York City, in 1941

In the United States, tellers held approximately 608,000 jobs in 2006. Of these, approximately 25% were classified as part-time. Median annual earnings as of May 2006 were $22,140.

The number of tellers in the United States increased from approximately 300,000 in 1970 to approximately 600,000 in 2010. A contributing factor in the period of increase may have been the introduction of automated teller machines due to the impact of induced demand: ATMs allow a branch to operate with fewer tellers, making it more economical for banks to open more branches, necessitating more tellers to staff those additional branches. In the later 2010s and the 2020s, automation and online banking (as anticipated) reversed this trend, leading to only 364,100 in 2022.

== Public figures who were former bank tellers ==
Many well-known personalities have worked as bank tellers including:

- Whoopi Goldberg
- Ray Romano
- Scott Adams
- William Singe
- Wolfgang Stark
- John Legend
- Kim Dong-yeon
- Josh Berry

== See also ==
- Automated teller machine (ATM)
- Front office (finance)
- Cashier
