= Windows Live Devices =

- Windows Live Devices homepage
- Developer(s): Microsoft
- Stable release: Wave 5 (v16.2.2907.1020) / November 29, 2011
- Type: Data synchronization service
- Website: Archived official website at the Wayback Machine (archive index)

Windows Live Devices was an online device management service as part of Windows Live which will allow users to centrally access and manage the synchronization of files stored on their computers, mobile devices, as well as other peripherals such as digital photo frames. Windows Live Devices also allows users to remotely access their computers from the internet using a web browser.

This service integrates tightly with Windows Live Mesh to allow files and folders between two or more computers be in sync with each other, as well as to be in sync with files and folders stored on the cloud with SkyDrive. (Now OneDrive) The combination of the three services: Windows Live Devices, Windows Live Mesh, and SkyDrive are very similar to the previous Live Mesh technology preview platform offering from Microsoft, and are based on the same underlying technology.

Windows Live Devices was released on June 24, 2010, as part of Windows Live Wave 4 suite of services.

== History ==
Microsoft released their Live Mesh software as a service platform on April 23, 2008 that enabled PCs and other devices to connect with each other through the internet using FeedSync technologies. Live Mesh allows applications, files and folders to be synchronized across multiple devices. Live Mesh was initially released as a technology preview, however, it was shortly updated to Beta on October 30, 2008 and at the same time incorporated as part of the Azure Services Platform - a "cloud" platform hosted at Microsoft data centers. Live Mesh consisted of the following four elements:

- Mesh Operating Environment - the software component of Live Mesh that manages the synchronization relationships between devices and data
- Live Desktop - the online cloud storage service that allows synchronized folders to be accessible via a website
- Live Mesh Remote Desktop - a software that allow users to remotely access, connect and manage to any of the devices in a synchronization relationship
- Live Framework - a REST-based application programming interface for accessing the Live Mesh services over HTTP

In January 2009, the Live Mesh team was merged into the unified Windows Live team at Microsoft such that its incubation technologies will be integrated into Windows Live services. As a result, Live Framework, the developer framework for Live Mesh, was discontinued on September 8, 2009 and was incorporated into Live Services - the developer resources central for all Windows Live services. As part of the merge, the Mesh Operating Environment, or simply the Live Mesh software, is replaced by Windows Live Mesh to support PC-to-PC as well as PC-to-cloud file synchronisation, and the online cloud storage service for Live Mesh - Live Desktop - is replaced by SkyDrive synchronised storage. Windows Live Devices will serve the purposes of managing and providing access to all devices in the synchronization relationship, as well as replacing the Live Mesh Remote Desktop to provide remote access functions to any devices in a synchronization relationship.

The Live Mesh technology preview platform supported the management and synchronisation of data between Windows and Mac OS X computers, mobiles devices, Windows Home Server, Xbox, Zune, Car Automation System, as well as other computer devices and peripherals such as printers, digital cameras, and digital photo frames. These capabilities of Live Mesh are expected to be integrated into Windows Live Devices and Windows Live Mesh in future releases.

== See also ==
- Windows Essentials
