= Microsoft Sync =

Microsoft Sync can refer to different technologies developed by Microsoft:

- Ford Sync, an in-car entertainment and navigation system
- Microsoft Sync Framework, a data synchronization platform
  Microsoft sync
