= Windows Live Mesh =

Microsoft file synchronization application

- Windows Live Mesh
- Developer: Microsoft
- Final release: 2011 (15.4.3555.0308 Win, 15.4.5726.23 Mac) / March 22, 2012; 13 years ago
- Operating system: Windows (XP and later) and Mac OS X (Intel Only)
- Type: File sharing
- Website: Archived official website at the Wayback Machine (archive index)

Windows Live Mesh (formerly known as Windows Live FolderShare, Live Mesh, and Windows Live Sync) is a discontinued free-to-use Internet-based file synchronization application by Microsoft designed to allow files and folders between two or more computers to be in sync with each other on Windows (Vista and later) and Mac OS X (v. 10.5 Leopard and later, Intel processors only) computers or the Web via SkyDrive. Windows Live Mesh also enabled remote desktop access via the Internet.

Windows Live Mesh was part of the Windows Live Essentials 2011 suite of software. However this application was replaced by SkyDrive for Windows application in Windows Essentials 2012 and later OneDrive in Windows 8/8.1/10. Microsoft announced on December 13, 2012, that Windows Live Mesh would be discontinued on February 13, 2013.

== Features ==
Features of Windows Live Mesh include:

- Ability to sync up to 200 folders with 100,000 files each (each file up to 40 GB) for PC-to-PC synchronization
- Ability to sync up to 5 GB of files to "SkyDrive synced storage" in the cloud
- Remote Desktop access via Windows Live Mesh and the Windows Live Devices web service
- PC-to-PC synchronisation of application settings for applications such as:
  - Windows Internet Explorer - synchronisation of favorites and recently typed URLs between computers
  - Microsoft Office - synchronisation of dictionaries, Outlook email signatures, styles and templates between computers

== History ==
=== FolderShare and Windows Live Sync ===
The original Windows Live FolderShare logo

Windows Live Sync "Wave 3" logo

Microsoft bought FolderShare from ByteTaxi Inc. on November 3, 2005, and subsequently made it a part of their Windows Live range of services.

On March 10, 2008, Microsoft released its first user visible update to the then Windows Live FolderShare. This comprised a rewrite of the FolderShare website and an updated Windows Live FolderShare client. Support for discussion groups and Remote Desktop Search was also removed in the update. The new client had some user interface and branding updates and contained several bug fixes - including official support for Windows Vista and discontinued support for Windows 2000.

Since its rebrand as Windows Live FolderShare, the client and service had undergone extensive platform changes, switching from the original LAMP which it was originally built on when acquired, to the Windows Server platform. In the Windows Live Essentials "Wave 3" release, Windows Live FolderShare was again rebranded as Windows Live Sync. New UI improvements were also announced to be part of the "Wave 3" release, integrating it with other Windows Live services. New features of the then Windows Live Sync "Wave 3" compared to FolderShare included increased limit of sync folders, integration with Windows Live ID, integration with Recycle Bin, unicode support, support for Mac OS X, and integration with Windows Live Photo Gallery and Windows Live Toolbar to sync photo albums and favorites between PCs. Windows Live Sync Wave 3 was released on December 11, 2008, and an update of Windows Live Sync for Mac was released on November 2, 2009, to add support for Mac OS X 10.6.

=== Live Mesh Beta ===
The Live Mesh Desktop

Microsoft released the Live Mesh technology preview on April 23, 2008, a data synchronization system that allowed files, folders and other data to be shared and synchronized across multiple personal devices and up to 5 GB on the web. Live Mesh was based on FeedSync technologies to convey the changes made in each device so that the changes can be synchronized across all devices and the cloud. The information about devices and folders participating in a synchronization relationship was not stored locally but at the service-end.

Architecture of the Live Mesh stack

The Live Mesh software, called Mesh Operating Environment (MOE), was available for Windows XP, Windows Vista, Windows 7, Mac OS X, as well as Windows Mobile 6. It could be used to create and manage the synchronization relationships between devices and data. Live Mesh also included a cloud storage component, called Live Desktop, which was an online storage service that allows synchronized folders to be accessible via a website. Live Mesh also provided a remote desktop software called Live Mesh Remote Desktop that could be used to remotely connect to and manage any of the devices in a synchronization relationship. Live Mesh Remote Desktop allowed users to control their devices from the Live Mesh application, as well as from any other internet connected PC.

Live Mesh also included a developer component, which consisted of a set of protocols and Application Programming Interfaces (API) known as Live Framework (which was also briefly known as MeshFX). It was a REST-based API for accessing the Live Mesh services over HTTP. Microsoft had also provided APIs for managed code (including .NET Framework and Microsoft Silverlight) as well as for Win32 and JavaScript via a developer Software Development Kit (SDK). Unlike the Mesh Operating Environment (MOE), which was limited to sharing folders, the Live Framework APIs could be used to share any data item between devices that recognize the data. The API encapsulated the data into a Mesh Object—the native synchronization unit of Live Mesh—which was then tracked for changes and synchronized. A Mesh Object consisted of a collection of Data Feeds, which could be represented in Atom, RSS, JSON or Plain Old XML formats. The data entries within these feeds were synchronized via the FeedSync protocol. The MOE software also created Mesh Objects for each Live Mesh folder in order for them to be synchronized. However, the Live Framework APIs were discontinued on September 8, 2010, with the aim of being integrated into Windows Live Messenger Connect in the "Wave 4" release. Live Mesh beta was officially discontinued on March 31, 2011.

=== Windows Live Mesh 2011 ===
A beta version Windows Live Sync "Wave 4" was released on June 24, 2010. This new version, while initially branded Windows Live Sync, was the first version which was built using both FolderShare and Live Mesh technologies. Compared to the "Wave 3" version of Windows Live Sync, the new version featured increased limit of sync folders and files, ability to sync up to 2 GB of files to the cloud on Windows Live SkyDrive synced storage, addition of Live Mesh's remote desktop access via Windows Live Devices, and ability to sync application settings for Internet Explorer and Microsoft Office. This new version of Windows Live Sync was also designed to be completely separate from both the previous versions of Windows Live Sync and Live Mesh, and as such any previous synchronisation relationships were not retained when being upgraded from Windows Live Sync "Wave 3" and Live Mesh. The previous Windows Live Sync "Wave 3" website, and the Live Mesh Desktop, was also replaced by the new Windows Live Devices service in the "Wave 4" release.

The beta was subsequently updated on August 17, 2010, and on August 29, 2010, the service was officially rebranded as Windows Live Mesh, and its cloud-based SkyDrive synced storage was increased to 5 GB, as was the case for the previous Live Mesh service. The new version also allows users to sync hidden files, view a list of missing files that are awaiting to be synchronised, and various performance improvements. The final version of Windows Live Mesh 2011 (Wave 4) was released on September 30, 2010, as part of Windows Live Essentials 2011.

=== SkyDrive ===
Microsoft announced on February 20, 2012, that Windows Live Mesh is set to be superseded by a new SkyDrive desktop application, where the cloud storage portion for the application will utilize the full 7 GB SkyDrive storage (or more if the user has purchased additional storage), rather than the limited 5 GB "SkyDrive synced storage" in the current version of Windows Live Mesh. However, the new SkyDrive desktop application will not support direct PC-to-PC synchronization, and must utilize the SkyDrive cloud storage for synchronization between two or more devices. On August 7, 2012, Microsoft released Windows Essentials 2012, where it was announced that Windows Live Mesh would be removed and replaced by the SkyDrive for Windows desktop application if a user upgrades from Windows Live Essentials 2011.

The Remote Desktop feature from Live Mesh, which allowed users to access the remote computer from the web browser, is not transferred to Skydrive. Users are directed to use Remote Desktop from a Windows computer instead.

Windows Live Mesh was discontinued on February 13, 2013, and some of the functionality is replaced by SkyDrive.

On January 27, 2014, Microsoft announced the rebranding of SkyDrive to "OneDrive".
