= MDB Tools =

The MDB tools project is an open source effort to create a set of software libraries and utilities to manipulate files in the proprietary JET 3, 4 and 5 database formats (used by Microsoft Access.).

Version 0.7 was released in June 2012. Jet 5 is only available on the GitHub master branch.

The MDB tools include Gnome MDB Viewer (gmdb2), a desktop tool for viewing MDB databases on Linux. Kexi (visual database applications creator) uses MDB tools for importing MDB databases. For Mac OS X there are three proprietary applications named MDB Explorer, MDB Viewer and MDBLite that also provides a graphical front end to the MDB tools library.

There is a Java port of the MDB tools library named Jackcess. Jackcess adds write support for Access versions 2000+, but has read-only support for Access 97. It seems to be under active development as of 2020.

UCanAccess is an open source pure Java JDBC Driver implementation which allows Java developers and jdbc client programs to read/write MDB and ACCDB files.
