= Randall C. Kennedy =

American businessman

Randall C Kennedy is director of research and cofounder of Competitive Systems Analysis, an IT consulting company. He was a former systems analyst for Giga Information Group. Kennedy was a contributor for InfoWorld, focusing on Windows, Microsoft and other topics, but was dismissed on February 21, 2010. In his announcement of the dismissal, InfoWorld editor-in-chief, Eric Knorr, stated that Kennedy had been dismissed for violating InfoWorld's policies of "integrity and honesty", and for "breach of trust".

Kennedy discovered an undocumented change in the protocol used by the Microsoft SQL Server Net-Lib component from named pipes to TCP/IP in Microsoft Data Access Components 2.6 that was fixed in the subsequent version 2.7). He also saw curious benchmark results when comparing performance of SQL Server on Windows NT 4 versus Windows 2000 but was prevented from publishing in Network World once Microsoft threatened legal action for his violation of the SQL Server software licence agreement.

== InfoWorld dismissal ==
Kennedy was dismissed from InfoWorld on 19 February 2010 for 'misrepresenting himself to other media organisations as Craig Barth CTO of Devil Mountain Software (a.k.a. exo.performance.network) in interviews for a number of stories regarding Windows and other Microsoft software topics' as Eric Knorr of InfoWorld explained 21 February. Knorr also explained that Devil Mountain Software 'is a Randall Kennedy business that specialises in the analysis of Windows performance data. There is no Craig Barth and Kennedy has stated this fabrication was a misguided effort to separate himself (or more accurately his InfoWorld blogger persona) from his Devil Mountain Software business'.

Kennedy now insists he was not sacked, that InfoWorld were trying to save the situation, that he on his own decided to resign, and that he is having a good time on his island home on Mauritius.
