= MSDE =

Microsoft SQL Server Data Engine (MSDE, also Microsoft Data Engine or Microsoft Desktop Engine) is a relational database management system developed by Microsoft. It is a scaled-down version of Microsoft SQL Server 7.0 or 2000 which is free for non-commercial use as well as certain limited commercial use. It was introduced at Microsoft TechEd in May 1999, and was included as part of Microsoft Office 2000 Developer Edition. Its successor, SQL Server Express was released in November 2005. Vendor support of MSDE ended on April 8, 2008.

== Overview ==
=== Microsoft Desktop Engine ===
MSDE was initially designed by (then) Microsoft Program Manager Jeff Alger and later implemented by Peter Byrne (core), Ronald Martinsen (core/setup), and Mike Maringas (setup). Alger and Martinsen are the co-inventors who hold the patent.

The initial release of MSDE is called the "Microsoft Desktop Engine", which is based on SQL Server 7.0 and was positioned as an alternative to using the Jet Database Engine used by Microsoft Access with a focus on its ability to operate as a client–server application instead of requiring direct access to the file system which the Jet database resided on. Microsoft Access, the company's most popular database tool at the time, was expanded for its Office 2000 release to incorporate using Microsoft Desktop Engine as its back-end data store. This design was promoted by Microsoft as a solution for small workgroups that may eventually grow to require the full SQL Server product. This initial release of MSDE also included the Data Transformation Services Wizard, which provided the ability to use OLE DB and ODBC data sources to transfer data between SQL Server 7.0 and MSDE. Supported operating systems at the time of its release included Windows 95, Windows 98, and Windows NT 4.0 Service Pack 4, and was available for both x86 and Alpha architectures.

Microsoft Data Engine can be found in Microsoft Access 2000 and other Microsoft products.

MSDE toolkit for Visual Studio 6.0 can be found in October 2000 MSDN DVD Office Test Platform and Development Tools, English Pack as MSDE for Visual Studio., or in October 2000 MSDN CD Office Test Platform and Development Tools (English Pack, European Pack I, Japanese Pack, Latin American pack).

=== Microsoft SQL Server Data Engine ===
It is based on SQL Server 2000. System requirement was changed to Windows 98.

MSDE could be distributed with commercial products by registering with Microsoft — in most cases this distribution is also free of charge. SQL Server's server licence includes right to distribute MSDE.

MSDE 2000 includes following resource kits: MSDE 2000 Deployment Resource Kit, MSDE 2000 Web Resource Kit.

MSDE 2000 is also found in various products, such as Microsoft Office XP (Professional, Developer), Visual Studio .NET 2002-2003.

== Features ==
Compared with the full server editions of SQL Server 7.0 and 2000, MSDE has some restrictions: a limit of 2 GB databases, and has a workload governor which reduces its speed when eight or more concurrent workloads are running. Microsoft has also stated that MSDE is not supported in Windows NT 6.0 operating systems such as Windows Vista. No graphical user interface management tools were released for MSDE, but Microsoft Access or SQL Server 2000's Enterprise Manager (as well as later versions such as SQL Server Management Studio) can be used to connect to it and manage it.

== See also ==
- SQL Server Compact
- SQL Server Express § LocalDB
