= DataAdapter =

ADO.NET component that bridges a data source and a DataSet

- Developer: Microsoft
- Written in: C# (reference implementation)
- Platform: .NET Framework, .NET
- Included with: System.Data/System.Data.Common
- Type: Data access component (ADO.NET)

In ADO.NET, a data adapter (DataAdapter) is an object that acts as a bridge between a data source and a disconnected in-memory data representation such as a DataSet, enabling data to be retrieved into the DataSet and later written back to the data source.

== Overview ==
The DataAdapter is an abstract base class in the System.Data.Common namespace; provider-specific implementations (such as for SQL Server, OLE DB, or ODBC) typically derive from DbDataAdapter. Data adapters are used with the ADO.NET disconnected model, where an application loads data into a memory-resident DataSet (including related tables, constraints, and relationships) and later reconciles changes back to the underlying data source.

== Operation ==
=== Filling a DataSet ===
A DataAdapter populates a DataSet (or DataTable) through its Fill method, using its SelectCommand to retrieve rows from the data source.

=== Updating the data source ===
A DataAdapter can persist changes made in the DataSet back to the data source using Update; it applies INSERT, UPDATE and DELETE operations as appropriate based on changes tracked in the DataSet, using command objects such as InsertCommand, UpdateCommand and DeleteCommand.

=== Schema and table mappings ===
Data adapters can also configure a DataSet's schema from the data source (for example, using FillSchema) and can map source table names to DataTable names through table mappings.

== Implementations ==
Provider-specific data adapters include:

- SqlDataAdapter for Microsoft SQL Server (System.Data.SqlClient)
- OleDbDataAdapter for OLE DB data sources (System.Data.OleDb)
- OdbcDataAdapter for ODBC data sources (System.Data.Odbc)

A DataSet can be filled and updated using multiple DataAdapter instances, and can contain related tables originating from different data sources exposed through different providers.

== See also ==
- ADO.NET
