= FeedSync =

Set of extensions to the RSS and Atom feed formats

FeedSync for Atom and RSS, previously Simple Sharing Extensions, are extensions to RSS and Atom feed formats designed to enable the bi-directional synchronization of information by using a variety of data sources. Initially developed by Ray Ozzie, Chief Software Architect at Microsoft, it is now maintained by Jack Ozzie, George Moromisato, Matt Augustine, Paresh Suthar and Steven Lees. Dave Winer, the designer of the UserLand Software RSS specification variants, has given input for the specifications.

The last version of FeedSync for Atom and RSS specification is 1.02. FeedSync for Atom and RSS is licensed under the Creative Commons Attribution-ShareAlike License (version 2.5) and the Microsoft Open Specification Promise.

The scope of FeedSync for Atom and RSS is to define the minimum extensions necessary to enable loosely cooperating applications to use Atom and RSS feeds as the basis for item sharing – that is, the bi-directional, asynchronous synchronization of new and changed items amongst two or more cross-subscribed feeds.

Note that while much of FeedSync is currently defined in terms of Atom and RSS feeds, at its core what FeedSync strictly requires is:

- A flat collection of items to be synchronized
- A set of per-item sync metadata that is maintained at all endpoints
- A set of algorithms followed by all endpoints to create, update, merge, and conflict resolve all items

This means that FeedSync can be implemented by almost any programming language have its metadata represented in many structured data formats.

== Examples ==
=== RSS feed ===
<?xml version="1.0" encoding="utf-8"?>
<rss version="2.0" xmlns:sx="http://feedsync.org/2007/feedsync">
 <channel>
  <title>To Do List</title>
  <description>A list of items to do</description>
  <link> https://www.example.com/something/foo/bar/ </link>
  <sx:sharing since="2005-02-13T18:30:02Z"
    until="2005-05-23T18:30:02Z" >
   <sx:related link="[http://example.com/all.xml]{{dead link|date=December 2016 |bot=InternetArchiveBot |fix-attempted=yes }}" type="complete" />
   <sx:related link="[http://example.com/B.xml]{{dead link|date=December 2016 |bot=InternetArchiveBot |fix-attempted=yes }}" type="aggregated" 
    title="To Do List (Jacks Copy)" />
  </sx:sharing>
  <item>
   <title>Buy groceries</title>
   <description>Get milk, eggs, butter and bread</description>
   <sx:sync id="item_1_myapp_2005-05-21T11:43:33Z" updates="3">
    <sx:history sequence="3" when="2005-05-21T11:43:33Z" by="JEO2000"/>
    <sx:history sequence="2" when="2005-05-21T10:43:33Z" by="REO1750"/>
    <sx:history sequence="1" when="2005-05-21T09:43:33Z" by="REO1750"/>
   </sx:sync>
  </item>
 </channel>
</rss>

=== Atom feed ===
<?xml version="1.0" encoding="utf-8"?>
<feed xmlns="http://www.w3.org/2005/Atom"
xmlns:sx="http://feedsync.org/2007/feedsync">
  <title>To Do List</title>
  <subtitle>A list of items to do</subtitle>
  <link rel="self" href="http://example.com/partial.xml"/{{dead link|date=December 2016 |bot=InternetArchiveBot |fix-attempted=yes }}>
  <author>
    <name>Ray Ozzie</name>
  </author>
  <updated>2005-05-21T11:43:33Z</updated>
  <id>urn:uuid:60a76c80-d399-11d9-b93C-0003939e0aaa</id>
  <sx:sharing since="2005-02-13T18:30:02Z"
    until="2005-05-23T18:30:02Z" >
   <sx:related link="[http://example.com/all.xml]{{dead link|date=December 2016 |bot=InternetArchiveBot |fix-attempted=yes }}" type="complete" />
   <sx:related link="[http://example.com/B.xml]{{dead link|date=December 2016 |bot=InternetArchiveBot |fix-attempted=yes }}" type="aggregated"
    title="To Do List (Jacks Copy)" />
  </sx:sharing>
  <entry>
   <title>Buy groceries</title>
   <content>Get milk, eggs, butter and bread</content>
   <id>urn:uuid:60a76c80-d399-11d9-b93C-0003939e0aa0</id>
   <author>
    <name>Ray Ozzie</name>
   </author>
   <updated>2005-05-21T11:43:33Z</updated>
   <sx:sync id="item_1_myapp_2005-05-21T11:43:33Z" updates="3">
    <sx:history sequence="3" when="2005-05-21T11:43:33Z" by="JEO2000"/>
    <sx:history sequence="2" when="2005-05-21T10:43:33Z" by="REO1750"/>
    <sx:history sequence="1" when="2005-05-21T09:43:33Z" by="REO1750"/>
   </sx:sync>
  </entry>
</feed>

=== POX item ===
<?xml version="1.0" encoding="utf-8"?>
<item>   
 <subject>Buy groceries</subject>    
 <body>Get milk and eggs</body>    
 <sx:sync id="item_1_myapp_2005-05-21T11:43:33Z" updates="1">   
  <sx:history sequence="1" when="2005-05-21T09:43:33Z" by="REO1750"/>    
 </sx:sync>    
</item>

=== JSON item ===
{    
 "title" : "Buy groceries",    
 "description": "Get milk and eggs",    
 "sync": 
 {    
  "id": "item_1_myapp_2005-05-21T11:43:33Z",    
  "updates": "1",    
  "history": [    
   {
    "sequence": "1", 
    "when": "2005-05-21T09:43:33Z", 
    "by": "REO1750"
   }    
  ]
 }    
}

== Examples of real world use ==
There are several examples of "real world" use of FeedSync feeds to synchronize data between applications.

=== FeedSync service ===
This prototype developer service is an implementation of HTTP-based FeedSync endpoint. Applications can use HTTP GET and POST commands to synchronize feeds, where the latter performs the FeedSync merge operation on the feed hosted by the FeedSync Service. The service is not active anymore.

=== Strong Angel III ===
FeedSync feeds were used extensively at the Strong Angel III exercise in August 2006 as a lightweight middle-ware to link applications from Microsoft, Google, ESRI and others on desktops and mobile devices. The service is not active anymore.

=== ROME project ===
The comprehensive Java RSS project, ROME, is an implementation of the FeedSync specification since it creates a Java layer for developers to create apps that will use the FeedSync service.

=== Mesh4x ===
Mesh4x, an open-source set of libraries, tools, applications and services for mesh-based applications, uses FeedSync as the versioning standard, and implements a Feedsync-inspired packet-based protocol to synchronize data over SMS text messages.

== See also ==
- Podcasting
- Syndication
- Microsoft Sync Framework
