= SQL Server Express =

Relational database management system

Microsoft SQL Server Express
- Developer: Microsoft
- Stable release: Microsoft SQL Server 2025 express / 18 November 2025; 25 days ago
- Written in: C, C++
- Operating system: Microsoft Windows, Linux
- Platform: .NET Framework 4.0
- Available in: English, Chinese, French, German, Italian, Japanese, Korean, Portuguese (Brazil), Russian, Spanish
- Type: Relational database management system
- License: Proprietary software
- Website: www.microsoft.com

Microsoft SQL Server Express Edition is an edition of Microsoft's SQL Server relational database management system that is free to download, distribute and use. It comprises a database specifically targeted for embedded and smaller-scale applications. The product traces its roots to the Microsoft Database Engine (MSDE) product, which was shipped with SQL Server 2000. The "Express Edition" branding has been used since the release of SQL Server 2005.

Microsoft SQL Server Express LocalDB is a version of Microsoft SQL Server Express, on-demand managed instance of the SQL Server engine. It is targeted to developers, and has the following restrictions: up to 50 GB database size and only local connections (network connections are not supported).

== Capabilities ==
SQL Server Express provides many of the features of the paid, full versions of Microsoft SQL Server database management system. However it has technical restrictions that make it unsuitable for some large-scale deployments. Differences in the Express product include:

- Maximum database size of 10 GB per database in SQL Server 2019, SQL Server 2017, SQL Server 2016, SQL Server 2014, SQL Server 2012, and 2008 R2 Express (4 GB for SQL Server 2008 Express and earlier; compared to 2 GB in the former MSDE). The limit applies per database (log files excluded); but in some scenarios users can access more data through the use of multiple interconnected databases.
- No SQL Server Agent service
- Restricted hardware usage limits:
  - Single physical CPU, but multiple cores allowable
  - 1 GB of RAM (runs on a system with higher RAM amount, but uses only at most 1 GB per instance of SQL Server Database Engine. "Recommended: Express Editions: 1 GB All other editions: At least 4 GB and should be increased as database size increases to ensure optimal performance."). Express with Advanced Services has a limit of 4 GB per instance of Reporting Services (not available on other Express variants). Analysis Services is not available for any Express variant.

Unlike the predecessor product, MSDE, the Express product does not include a concurrent workload-governor to "limit performance if the database engine receives more work than is typical of a small number of users."

SQL Server Express includes several GUI tools for database management. These include:

- SQL Server Management Studio – since 2012 SP1; before that, only a stripped-down version called SQL Server Management Studio Express is provided
- SQL Server Configuration Manager
- SQL Server Surface Area Configuration tool
- SQL Server Business Intelligence Development Studio

The predecessor product MSDE generally lacked basic GUI management tools,

Features available in SQL Server "Standard" and better editions but absent from SQL Server Express include:

- Analysis Services
- Integration Services
- Notification Services

== LocalDB ==
SQL Server Express LocalDB announced at 2011.

This version supports silent installation, requires no management and is compatible with other editions of SQL Server at the API level.

LocalDB runs as non-admin user, requires no configuration or administration.

LocalDB limits to local system only and supports no remote connections. A special connection string is needed to connect this version.

It is possible create several instances of the LocalDB for different applications. Default instance names 'SqlLocalDB'.

== Variants ==
Microsoft makes SQL Server Express N1 available as:

- An integrated edition with management tools
- Core database-engine only
- A SQL Server Express with Advanced Services edition (first introduced relatively late in Q2 2006 compared to the original release) with a reduced-functionality version of SQL Server Reporting Services and with full-text search capabilities

In the Free 2005 Express version, for example, a standard approach to installation options was provided, as follows. Generally, the SQL 2005 Express installers are packaged with the following consistent naming convention:

SQLEXPR.EXE
Has installers for BOTH 32-bit and 64-bit processors, but is a basic install
SQLEXPR32.EXE
Has ONLY the installer for 32-bit processors (still the basic install)
SQLEXPRWT.EXE
Has installers for BOTH 32-bit and 64-bit processors and SQL Server Management Studio Express (SSMSE) (2008 R2)
SQLEXPR_ADV.EXE
Has the basics and SQL Server Management Studio Express (SSMSE) + Reporting and Full Text Queries
SQLEXPR_TOOLKIT.EXE
Has the basics and SSMSE and Business Intelligence Development Studio (BIDS)

These optional variants have gone through several service packs (SP), and each SP installer can be used without using the older ones first:

- Originals of the above files all carry the version number 9.0.1399.6
- Service Pack 2 (SP2) versions all carry the version number 9.0.3042
- Service Pack 3 (SP3) versions all carry the version number 9.00.4035
- Service Pack 4 (SP4) versions all carry the version number 9.00.5000

SqlLocalDB.msi
Microsoft® SQL Server Express LocalDB Installer.
SQLLocalDB.exe
CLI Microsoft® SQL Server Express LocalDB (LocalDB manipulation tool).

== Version history ==
Microsoft SQL Server Express version history
Version	Release date	Mainstream support end date	Extended support end date	Supported operating systems
SQL Server 2005 Express Edition	2005-11-07	2011-04-12	2016-04-12	Windows 2000 Service Pack 4, Windows XP Service Pack 2, Windows Server 2003 Service Pack, Windows 7 Service Pack 1 (only SQL Server 2005 Express Edition SP4)
SQL Server 2008 Express	2009-02-08	2014-07-08	2019-07-09	Windows XP Service Pack 2, Windows XP Service Pack 3, Windows Vista, Windows Vista Service Pack 1, Windows Server 2003 Service Pack 2, Windows Server 2008
SQL Server 2008 R2 Express	2010-04-16	2014-07-08	2019-07-09	Windows XP, Windows Vista, Windows 7, Windows 8, Windows Server 2003, Windows Server 2008, Windows Server 2008 R2, Windows Server 2012, Windows Server 2012 R2
SQL Server 2012 Express	2012-05-14	2017-07-11	2022-07-12	Windows Vista Service Pack 2, Windows 7, Windows 7 Service Pack 1, Windows 8, Windows 8.1, Windows Server 2008, Windows Server 2008 R2, Windows Server 2008 R2 SP1, Windows Server 2012, Windows Server 2012 R2
SQL Server 2014 Express	2014-04-01	2019-07-09	2024-07-09	Windows 7 Service Pack 1, Windows 8, Windows 8.1, Windows 10, Windows Server 2008 SP2, Windows Server 2008 R2 SP1, Windows Server 2012, Windows Server 2012 R2
SQL Server 2016 Express	2016-06-01	2021-07-13	2026-07-14	Windows 8, Windows 8.1, Windows 10, Windows Server 2012, Windows Server 2012 R2, Windows Server 2016
SQL Server 2017 Express	2017-09-29	2022-10-11	2027-10-12	Windows 8, Windows 8.1, Windows 10, Windows Server 2012, Windows Server 2012 R2, Windows Server 2016*, Red Hat Enterprise Linux 7.3 or 7.4, SUSE Enterprise Linux Server v12 SP2, Ubuntu 16.04LTS, Docker Engine 1.8+ (on Windows, Mac, or Linux)
SQL Server 2019 Express	2019-11-04	2025-01-07	2030-01-08	Windows 10 TH1 1507 or greater, Windows Server 2016 or greater, Red Hat Enterprise Linux 7.3 or greater, SUSE Enterprise Linux Server v12 SP2, Ubuntu 16.04LTS, Docker Engine 1.8+ (on Windows, Mac, or Linux)
SQL Server 2022 Express	2022-11-16	2028-01-11	2033-01-11	
SQL Server 2025 Express	2025-11-18	2031-01-06	2036-01-06	Windows 10 or greater, Windows Server 2019 or greater, Red Hat Enterprise Linux 9, Ubuntu 22.04LTS, Docker Engine 1.8+ (on Windows, Mac, or Linux)

== See also ==
- SQL Server Compact
- MSDE
- SQLite
- Microsoft SQL Server
- Microsoft Servers
- List of relational database management systems
- Comparison of relational database management systems
