= Kusto =

Kusto may refer to:

- Kustö, the Swedish name of Kuusisto (island), Finland
- Marek Kusto (born 1954), Polish football player
- Microsoft Kusto, a query language used in Azure Data Explorer
