= QL =

QL may refer to:

- .QL, an object-oriented query language used to retrieve data from relational database management systems
- QL (chemical), the chemical isopropyl aminoethylmethyl phosphonite, a precursor to the nerve agent VX (NATO code)
- Quadratus lumborum muscle, a muscle in the lower back
- Query language, computer languages used to make queries into databases and information systems
- ATCvet code QL (Antineoplastic and immunomodulating agents), a section of the Anatomical Therapeutic Chemical Classification System for veterinary medicinal products
- Sinclair QL, a personal computer released by Sinclair Research in 1984
- Bedford QL, a three-ton military 4x4 truck by Bedford Vehicles
- Philips QL, an induction lighting system by Philips; see electrodeless lamp
- Le Québécois Libre, a political webzine
- Queensland, Australia
- Queen Latifah, American hip-hop artist, singer and Oscar-nominated actress
