= Soufflé (programming language) =

Parallel logic programming language

- Paradigms: Declarative, Logic programming
- Family: Datalog
- Stable release: 2.3
- Typing discipline: Static
- License: UPL
- Filename extensions: .dl
- Website: souffle-lang.github.io

Influenced by
- Datalog

Soufflé is an open source parallel logic programming language, influenced by Datalog. Soufflé includes both an interpreter and a compiler that targets parallel C++. Soufflé has been used to build static analyzers, disassemblers, and tools for binary reverse engineering. Soufflé is considered by academic researchers to be high-performance and "state of the art," and is often used in benchmarks in academic papers.

== Programming examples ==
Given a set of edges in a graph, the following program computes the set of (directed) paths between any two nodes. This is also known as the transitive closure of the edge relation.

.decl edge(x:number, y:number)
.input edge

.decl path(x:number, y:number)
.output path

path(x, y) :- edge(x, y).
path(x, y) :- path(x, z), edge(z, y).

== Features ==
- An interpreter and a compiler that targets parallel C++ (C++ that uses OpenMP). Both the interpreter and compiler use semi-naïve evaluation.
- Stratified negation
- Aggregation
- Automatic index selection
- Specialized parallel data structures, including disjoint-sets, B-trees, and tries.
- Static typing
- Records and algebraic data types
- A foreign function interface

=== Related tools ===
In addition to a compiler and an interpreter, the Soufflé project also publishes:

- a profiler,
- a "provenance"-based debugger,
- an "auto-scheduler" (also called a "join optimizer") that chooses efficient query plans based on a profile, as in profile-guided optimization.

== Applications ==
Soufflé has been used to build static analyzers, including:

- A pointer analysis for Java
- A control-flow analysis for Scheme
- Various analyses for smart contract languages

It has also been used to build tools for binary analysis, including reverse engineering, and disassemblers.
