= UCQ =

UCQ may refer to:

- Central Queensland University, Queensland, Australia
- University of Calgary in Qatar, a campus of the Canadian university
- Quebec Citizens' Union (French: Union citoyenne du Québec), a former political party in Quebec, Canada
- Union of conjunctive queries, a query language on relational databases
