= Semmle =

English code analysis platform

- Company type: Subsidiary
- Founded: December 2006 in Oxford, England
- Headquarters: San Francisco, California, U.S.
- Founder: Oege de Moor
- Key people: Oege de Moor, Pavel Avgustinov, Julian Tibble
- Industry: Software analysis
- Products: Code analysis software and services
- Parent: GitHub (2019–present)
- Website: semmle.com

Semmle Inc is a code-analysis platform; Semmle was acquired by GitHub (itself owned by Microsoft) on 18 September 2019 for an undisclosed amount. Semmle's LGTM technology automates code review, tracks developer contributions, and flags software security issues. The LGTM platform leverages the CodeQL query engine (formerly QL) to perform semantic analysis on software code bases. GitHub aims to integrate Semmle technology to provide continuous vulnerability detection services. In November 2019, use of CodeQL was made free for research and open source. CodeQL either shares a direct pedigree with .QL (dot-que-ell), which derives from the Datalog family tree, or is an evolution of similar technology.

SemmleCode is an object-oriented query language for deductive databases developed by Semmle. It is distinguished within this class by its support for recursive query.

== Corporate background ==
The company was headquartered in San Francisco, with its development operations based in Blue Boar Court, Alfred Street, central Oxford, England. Semmle's customers included Credit Suisse, NASA, and Dell.

== SemmleCode background ==
=== Academic ===
SemmleCode builds on academic research on querying the source of software programs. The first such system was Linton's Omega system, where queries were phrased in QUEL. QUEL did not allow for recursion in queries, making it difficult to inspect hierarchical program structures such as the call graph. The next significant development was therefore the use of logic programming, which does allow such recursive queries, in the XL C++ Browser. The disadvantage of using a full logic programming language is however that it is very difficult to attain acceptable efficiency. The CodeQuest system, developed at the University of Oxford, was the first to exploit the observation that Datalog, a very restrictive version of logic programming, is in the sweet spot between expressive power and efficiency. The QL query language is an object-oriented version of Datalog.

=== Industrial ===
The early research works on querying the source of software programs spun off a number of industrial applications. In particular it became the cornerstone of systems for application intelligence (data mining on the source of software systems) and software renovation. In 2007, Paris-based CAST is one of the market leaders in that area, and other significant players include BluePhoenix in Herzliya, Israel. SemmleCode differs from these systems in its use of an object-oriented query language, which allows programmers to easily formulate new queries that are particular to their own project.

A full account of the academic and industrial developments leading up to the creation of SemmleCode can be found in a paper by Hajiyev et al.

== Sample query in QL ==
To illustrate the use of QL, consider the well-known rule in object-oriented programming that public fields should be declared final. To find violations of that rule, we should search for fields that are public but not final. In QL, that requirement is expressed as follows:

 from Field f
 where f.hasModifier("public")
       and
       not(f.hasModifier("final"))
 select f.getDeclaringType().getPackage(),
        f.getDeclaringType(),
        f

Here not only is the offending field f selected, but also the package and type in which its declaration occurs.

== SemmleCode integration with development environments ==
SemmleCode provides a user interface via the Eclipse IDE to query Java code (both source code and bytecode) as well as XML files, and to edit QL queries. This is however but one application of the technology that underlies it: QL can be used to query any other type of complex data.

As part of the fold into the Microsoft/GitHub corporate house, the original Eclipse-based workflow has been supplanted with a workflow based around Microsoft's Visual Studio Code.

== See also ==
- List of tools for static code analysis
