= FQL =

FQL may refer to:

- Facebook Query Language
- Faqirwali railway station, in Pakistan
