= Ilka Groenewold =

German television presenter, singer and athlete

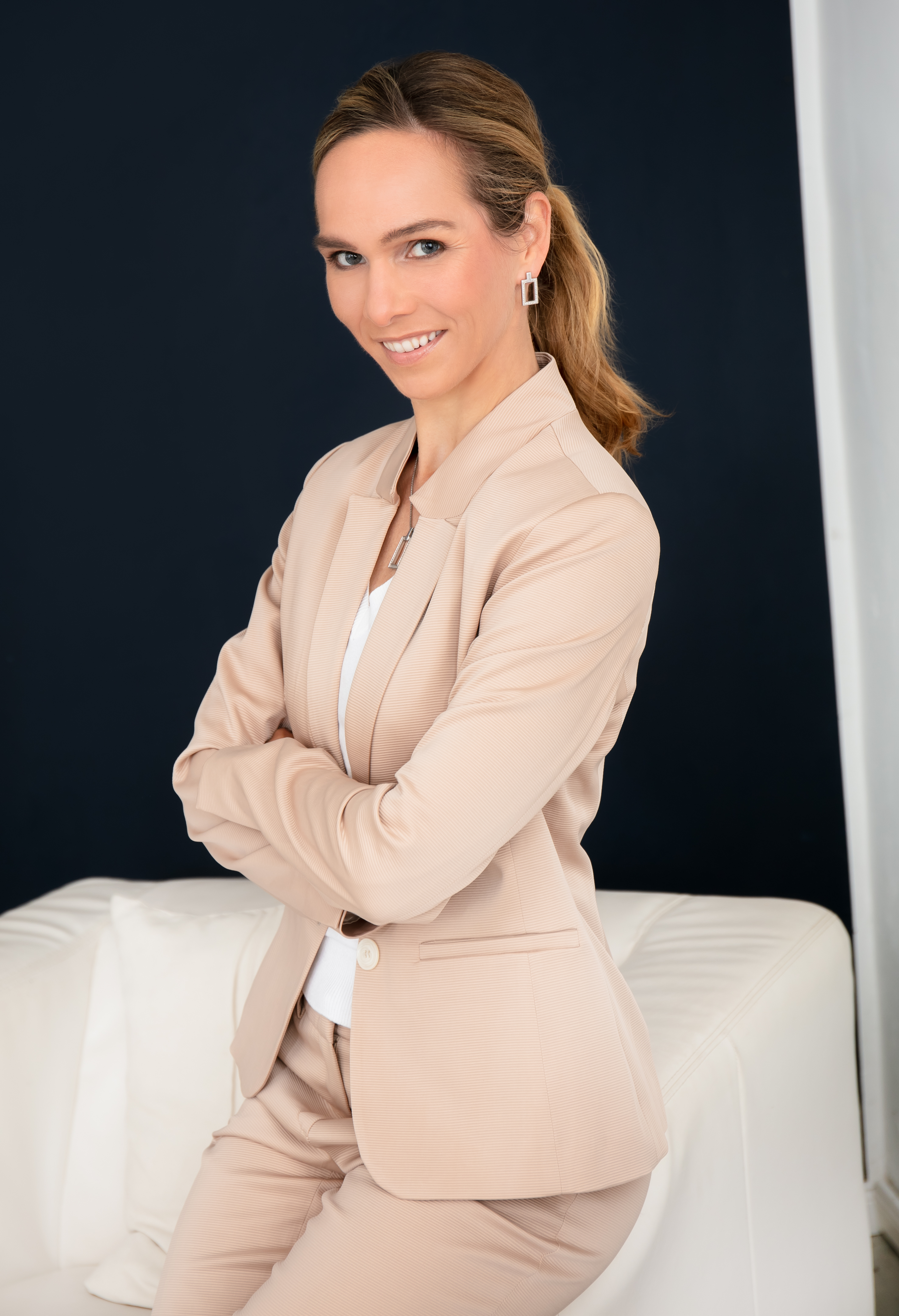
- Ilka Groenewold
- Born: March 6, 1985 (age 41); Leer (East Frisia), West Germany
- Citizenship: Germany
- Education: Teletta-Groß-Gymnasium in Leer; Hamburg School of Entertainment; University of Hamburg
- Occupations: German television presenter and athlete
- Years active: 2001 to present
- Notable work: "Ewig dauert die Sekunde" (2020); "Empowerment - Wegweiser in ein erfülltes Leben" ISBN 979-8665564791 (2020); "Empowerment - Guide to a Fulfilled Life" ISBN 979-8703383544 (2021); "Erfolgskompass - Deine Reise zum Erfolg" ISBN 979-8807103857 (2022); "Unikat" (2023)
- Awards: Hamburg's Ice Princess ambassador of the Hanseatic city of Hamburg (2011); Runner of the Year DLV German Athletics Association (2012); Young Entrepreneur Award (2013); 59th Bieler Lauftage, Biel/Bienne 2017 1st place W30 (2017); 12th Cuxhavener Stadtsparkassen Marathon 2018 1st place (2018); Role Model Entrepreneur Federal Ministry for Economic Affairs and Energy (2020)
- Website: www.ilkagroenewold.de

Ilka Groenewold (* March 6, 1985 in Leer (East Frisia), West Germany) is a German television presenter, singer and athlete.

== Life ==
Ilka Groenewold graduated in 2005 from the Teletta-Groß-Gymnasium in Leer. She completed a musical theater training at the Hamburg School of Entertainment, during which she appeared on the theater stage in Hamburg productions at the Hamburger Schauspielhaus, Thalia Theater and Operettenhaus.

Ilka Groenewold studied American Studies and Sports Science at the University of Hamburg in Hamburg from 2012 to 2015. She graduated with a Bachelor of Arts degree. Before and during her studies, Ilka hosted events and worked at VIVA in 2001 and Channel 21 in 2012. In 2007, Ilka played the role of Lisi in the sitcom "Wilde Jungs" on ProSieben. In 2010, she was a reporter on Galileo.

In parallel, Ilka Groenewold participated in running events and was named "Hobbyläufer des Jahres" ("hobby runner of the year") in 2012 by the Deutscher Leichtathletik Verband.

Since 2023 Ilka has been a journalist and reporter for Welt and for the Hamburg station "Hamburg 1" since November 2021. In 2022, Ilka has been the presenter of the daily news programme "Hamburg 1 Aktuell". In June 2022, Ilka hosts the Handball Champions League Final (EHF Final 4 Men) in Cologne.

In the manga series Naruto, she took on the roles of "Mikoto Uchiha", "Ajisai" and the stadium announcer in "Boruto: Naruto the Movie".

In the fall of 2020 her book "Empowerment - Wegweiser in ein erfülltes Leben" was published. It is a guide book on fitness, nutrition, motivation, finance, real estate, mindset etc.

In May 2022 Ilka published her 2nd book "Erfolgskompass – deine Reise zum Erfolg", which was also published in the English version "Success Compass - Your Journey to Success" in July 2022.

Since April 2023 Ilka is part of the WELT TV Reporter Team. On April 15, 2023, Ilka reports as a reporter at the AKW-Abschaltung, at the Fremantle Highway accident and at the Wacken Festival for Welt (TV channel) on the nuclear power plant shutdown in Lingen or kidnapping at the airport, The Rescue of Timmy the Humpback Whale and many other political and social issues. Since 2026, Ilka has also been part of the :newstime reporting team and appears on camera for the Sat.1/Pro7/Kabel1 news programs as well as Sat.1 Frühstücksfernsehen.

Since November 2023 Ilka is also on the road as a pop singer and released her 1st single "Unikat" on Universal Music/Fiesta Records on November 10, 2023. Ilka's 2nd single "wir leben hoch" was released in March 2024 and reached number 40 in the Official German Airplay Charts. In September 2024, Ilka's 4th single "Dreh dich um" also made it into the charts and entered at number 44 and remained in the charts for over 17 weeks. At the end of January 2025, Ilka's song "Elektrisiert" makes it into the airplay charts and reaches number 39. "Mir dir für immer siebzehn" has been on the airplay charts for 23 weeks and reached the Top 30. Ilka's first album, "Unikat," will be released in November 2025.

Ilka Groenewold lives in Hamburg and Leer/East Frisia.

== Discography ==
- 2023: "Unikat"
- 2024: "Wir leben hoch"
- 2024: "Baila me"
- 2024: "Dreh dich um"
- 2025: "Elektrisiert"
- 2025: "Mamma Mia"
- 2025: "Ich würd es immer wieder tun"
- 2025: "Ich will dich 24/7"
- 2025: "Unikat" (Album)
- 2026: "Mit dir für immer siebzehn"
- 2026: "Und wenn ich träum"
- 2026: "Apartment 7"

== Books ==
- 2020: "Empowerment – Wegweiser in ein erfülltes Leben" ISBN 979-8665564791
- 2021: "Empowerment – Guide to a Fulfilled Life" ISBN 979-8703383544
- 2022: "Erfolgskompass – Deine Reise zum Erfolg" ISBN 979-8807103857
- 2022: "Success Compass – Your Journey to Success" ISBN 979-8838122322
- 2025: "KI-Tools im Alltag - Dein smarter Guide zur neuen Normalität" ISBN 979-8293588343
- 2025: "Souverän auf jeder Bühne: Wie du mit Persönlichkeit, Präsenz und Stimme überzeugst" ISBN 979-8296610706

== Awards ==
- 2011 Hamburg's Ice Princess ambassador of the Hanseatic city of Hamburg
- 2012 Runner of the Year DLV German Athletics Association
- 2013 Young Entrepreneur Award
- 2017 59th Bieler Lauftage, Biel/Bienne 2017 1st place W30
- 2018 12th Cuxhavener Stadtsparkassen Marathon 2018 1st place
- 2020 Role Model Entrepreneur Federal Ministry for Economic Affairs and Energy
- 2021 Red Fox Award Winner
- 2021 Presenter of the Year (2021) Winner
- 2022 Digitale Orte Niedersachsen Winner
- 2023 Bester Schlagersong beim 41. Deutschen Rock & Pop Preis 2023 Winner
- 2023 Ministerin im Senat der Wirtschaft
- 2024 Unternehmerin der Zukunft (Auszeichnung durch das Deutsche Innovationsinstitut für Nachhaltigkeit und Digitalisierung)
