= DLV (disambiguation) =

DLV may refer to:

- 555 (number), written as DLV in Roman numerals
- DataLog with Disjunction, a logic programming system, referred to as DLV
- Delavirdine (DLV), a non-nucleoside reverse transcriptase inhibitor (NNRTI) marketed by ViiV Healthcare
- DNSSEC Lookaside Validation, a DNS record type in Domain Name System Security Extensions
- German Air Sports Association, Deutscher Luftsportverband or DLV, clandestine predecessor of the Luftwaffe
- German Agricultural Workers' Union, Deutscher Landarbeiter-Verband or DLV, a former trade union
- German Athletics Association, Deutscher Leichtathletik-Verband or DLV, governing body of athletics in Germany
