= NonProcedural Language =

Relational database language

NPL (for NonProcedural Language) was a declarative programming language for querying relational databases developed by T.D. Truitt et al. in 1980 for Apple II and, later, for MS-DOS.
