= LogicBlox =

Logic programming language

LogiQL
- Paradigms: Declarative, Logic programming
- Family: Datalog
- Typing discipline: Static
- License: Commercial
- Website: "LogicBlox – Next Generation Analytics Applications". Archived from the original on 2023-07-23.

Influenced by
- Datalog

The LogicBlox system is a commercial, declarative, incremental logic programming language and deductive database inspired by Datalog. The LogiQL programming language extends Datalog with several features, including stratified negation, aggregation, and a module system. LogicBlox has been used to build pointer analyses for Java.

On December 3, 2014, Predictix acquired LogicBlox. On June 28, 2016, Infor acquires Predictix.

== Features ==
- Stratified negation
- Aggregate functions
- Evaluation using a novel worst-case optimal join algorithm.
- Data constructors
- Static typing
- A module system
- Probabilistic programming features
- Incremental computation
- Debugging with provenance

== See also ==
- Datalog
