= Poliqarp =

Open-source search engine

Poliqarp is an open source search engine designed to process text corpora, among others the National Corpus of Polish created at the Institute of Computer Science, Polish Academy of Sciences.

== Features ==
- Custom query language
- Two-level regular expressions:
  - operating at the level of characters in words
  - operating at the level of words in statements/paragraphs
- Good performance
- Compact corpus representation (compared to similar projects)
- Portability across operating systems: Linux/BSD/Win32
- Lack of portability across endianness (current release works only on little endian devices)
