= National Corpus of Polish =

The National Corpus of Polish (Polish : Narodowy Korpus Języka Polskiego NKJP) is the biggest and the most important corpus of the Polish language. A linguistic corpus is a collection of texts where one can find the typical use of a single word or a phrase, as well as their meaning and grammatical function.

== Description ==
The National Corpus of Polish is a shared initiative of four institutions: Institute of Computer Science and the Institute of the Polish Language at the Polish Academy of Sciences, Polish Scientific Publishers PWN, and the Department of Computational and Corpus Linguistics at the University of Łódź. It has been registered as a research-development project of the Ministry of Science and Higher Education.

The intended size of the whole National Corpus of Polish is over 1 billion words, of which a 300-million word subcorpus has been carefully balanced, and a manually-annotated 1-million corpus has been released under an open license. The corpus is accessible online at http://nkjp.pl/poliqarp/

The corpus contains classic literature, daily newspapers, specialist periodicals and journals, transcripts of conversations, and a variety of short-lived and internet texts.

== Search Engines ==
- PELCRA – 1200 million words from three corpora : IPIPAN, PELCRA, PWN. It is easy to use and the results can be downloaded in the form of spreadsheets. A special query syntax also allows the use of morphological expansion and spelling, the search in one query options and flexible lexical phraseological compounds. PELCRA offers also a visualization of the registry function and the generation of time series for words, phrases and idioms.
- POLIQARP – Poliqarp gives the ability to search for specific words or phrases. It also allows to find the sequence determined using regular expressions, for example, all occurring in the body of phrases consisting of a noun and an adjective or all of the grammatical forms of the selected word (especially useful for studies on the Polish language.) These operations, both online and offline, can be executed pretty quickly – e.g. simple search queries take no more than a few seconds.

== History ==
The first corpus to emerge was developed by the Institute of the Polish Language, Polish Academy of Sciences (not publicly available), followed by the corpus of PWN publishers, then the corpus of the PELCRA group at the University of Łódź, and finally the corpus of the Institute of Computer Science, Polish Academy of Science. All four teams decided to join forces in 2006, forming the Consortium for the National Corpus of Polish.
