= Path expression =

In query languages, path expressions identify an object by describing how to navigate to it in some graph (possibly implicit) of objects. For example, the path expression p.Manager.Home.City might refer the city of residence of someone's manager. Path expressions have been extended to support regular expression-like flexibility. XPath is an example of a path expression language.

In concurrency control, path expressions are a mechanism for expressing permitted sequences of execution. For example, a path expression like " {read}, write" might specify that either multiple simultaneous executions of read or a single execution of write but not both are allowed at any point in time.

It is important to know that the path expressions are a mechanism for the synchronization of processes at the monitor level in the software. That provides a clear and structured approach to the description of shared data and the coordination and communication between concurrent processes. This method is flexible in its ability to express timing, and can be used in different ways.

In addition, path expressions are useful for process synchronization for two reasons: first, the close relationship between stream expressions and regular expressions that simplify the task of writing and reasoning about programs that use this synchronization mechanism. Second, synchronization in many concurrent programs in a finite state, and therefore can be adequately described by regular expressions. For precisely the same reasons, path expressions are useful for controlling the behavior of complicated asynchronous circuits. In fact, the finite state assumption may be even more reasonable at the hardware level than at the monitor level.

Path expressions provide a high level of descriptive synchronization that aids in the prevention and detection of design errors in complex systems and overcomes some of the dangers, such as certain forms of coding errors.

== See also ==
- Object database
