= DatalogZ =

Extension of Datalog with integer arithmetic

DatalogZ (stylized as Datalog_{ℤ}) is an extension of Datalog that incorporates integer arithmetic and comparisons. Although the general language is undecidable due to unrestricted numeric operations, structurally constrained fragments provide a unified logical framework for declarative data analysis with strict termination guarantees.

== Syntax and Semantics ==
The syntax of DatalogZ extends standard Datalog with numeric terms—comprising integers, variables, and functions built with addition, subtraction, and multiplication—and comparison atoms (such as t < s or t <= s). Its semantics build upon model-theoretic Herbrand interpretations evaluated under standard integer arithmetic. Fact entailment is defined via the least fixpoint of a transfinite immediate consequence operator.

== Limit DatalogZ ==
To address the undecidability of generic DatalogZ, limit DatalogZ restricts intensional predicates to a single maximal or minimal numeric position. Its models are required to be limit-closed: if a max (resp. min) limit fact holds for an integer bound, it implicitly holds for all larger (resp. smaller) bounds.

=== Limit-Linear Fragment ===
Fact entailment remains undecidable in limit DatalogZ if multiplication is completely unrestricted. The limit-linear fragment restores decidability by enforcing a linearity condition: at most one argument in any multiplication operation may contain unguarded (unstratified) numeric variables. This constraint ensures that evaluating rule applicability reduces to an Integer Linear Programming problem, ensuring decidable termination.

== Computational Complexity ==
The computational properties of limit-linear DatalogZ scale across structural tiers based on its syntactic fragments:

- Positive / Semi-positive: coNEXP-complete (combined complexity) and coNP-complete (data complexity). It captures \(\text{coNP}\) over ordered datasets.
- Stratified Negation: \(\Delta_2^{\text{EXP}}\)-complete (combined complexity) and \(\Delta_2^{\text{P}}\)-complete (data complexity). It captures \(\Delta_2^{\text{P}}\) over ordered datasets.
- Stable / Type-Consistent: EXP-complete (combined complexity) and P-complete (data complexity).

=== Stable and Type-Consistent Programs ===
To satisfy data-intensive database applications, researchers identify a semantic condition called stability. In stable programs, numeric arguments along a cyclic dependency graph cannot diverge infinitely. Because stability is undecidable to check statically, a localized syntactic check called type-consistency is used. Type-consistent programs guarantee tractable, polynomial-time data evaluation matching the bounds of standard Datalog.

== Aggregation ==
Limit-linear DatalogZ supports native aggregation operators (such as `sum`, `count`, `max`, and `min`) to streamline data analysis tasks. Native aggregation constructs do not increase the core expressive power of the language; any program utilizing aggregates can be polynomially rewritten into an aggregate-free equivalent over ordered datasets using inductive counters.

== See also ==
- Constraint logic programming
- Answer set programming
- Descriptive complexity theory
