= Disjunctive Datalog =

Disjunctive Datalog is an extension of the logic programming language Datalog that allows disjunctions in the heads of rules. This extension enables disjunctive Datalog to express several NP-hard problems that are not known to be expressable in plain Datalog. Disjunctive Datalog has been applied in the context of reasoning about ontologies in the semantic web. DLV is an implementation of disjunctive Datalog.

== Syntax ==
A disjunctive Datalog program is a collection of rules. A rule is a clause of the form:

$$a_1 \vee  \dots \vee  a_n \leftarrow b_1 \wedge  \dots \wedge  b_m \quad 1 \leq n, 0 \leq m$$

where $b_1$, ..., $b_m$ may be negated, and may include (in)equality constraints.

== Semantics ==
There are at least three ways to define the semantics of disjunctive Datalog:

- Minimal model semantics
- Perfect model semantics
- Disjunctive stable model semantics, which generalizes the stable model semantics

== Expressivity ==
Disjunctive Datalog can express several NP-complete and NP-hard problems, including the travelling salesman problem, graph coloring, maximum clique problem, and minimal vertex cover. These problems are only expressible in Datalog if the polynomial hierarchy collapses.

== Implementations ==
The DLV (DataLog with Disjunction, where the logical disjunction symbol V is used) system implements the disjunctive stable model semantics.

== See also ==
- Syntax and semantics of logic programming

== Sources ==
=== References ===
- Eiter, Thomas; Gottlob, Georg; Mannila, Heikki (1997-09-01). "Disjunctive datalog". ACM Transactions on Database Systems. 22 (3): 364–418. doi:10.1145/261124.261126. ISSN 0362-5915. S2CID 8755376.
