= Facebook Query Language =

Query language

- First appeared: February 2007; 19 years ago
- Platform: Facebook Platform
- Website: developers.facebook.com

Influenced by
- SQL

Facebook Query Language (FQL) is a query language that allows querying Facebook user data by using a SQL-style interface, avoiding the need to use the Facebook Platform Graph API. Data returned from an FQL query is in JSON format by default.

== History ==
FQL was first made publicly available in February 2007. FQL was no longer available as of August 7, 2016, when Facebook API 2.0 was no longer available. Facebook API versions newer than API 2.0 do not support FQL.

== Example ==
In the following query, four different types of data are retrieved from a single table (status) and for a single user ("me"):

SELECT status_id,message,time,source FROM `status` WHERE uid = me()

This query can run by querying the Facebook graph endpoint /fql with the parameters set to q=[FQL]
