= PTQL =

Program Trace Query Language (PTQL) is a language based on relational queries over program traces, in which programmers can write expressive, declarative queries about program behavior.

== Sources ==
Conference on Object Oriented Programming Systems Languages and Applications archive Proceedings of the 20th annual ACM SIGPLAN conference on Object oriented programming, systems, languages, and applications http://portal.acm.org/citation.cfm?id=1094811.1094841&coll=GUIDE&dl=GUIDE&CFID=10871926&CFTOKEN=54412436
