= Boolean conjunctive query =

Query returning true/false based on whether a conjunction of conditions holds

In the theory of relational databases, a Boolean conjunctive query is a conjunctive query without distinguished predicates, i.e., a query in the form $R_1(t_1) \wedge \cdots \wedge R_n(t_n)$, where each $R_i$ is a relation symbol and each $t_i$ is a tuple of variables and constants; the number of elements in $t_i$ is equal to the arity of $R_i$. Such a query evaluates to either true or false depending on whether the relations in the database contain the appropriate tuples of values, i.e. the conjunction is valid according to the facts in the database.

As an example, if a database schema contains the relation symbols Father (binary, who's the father of whom) and Employed (unary, who is employed), a conjunctive query could be $Father(\text{Mark}, x) \wedge Employed(x)$. This query evaluates to true if there exists an individual x who is a child of Mark and employed. In other words, this query expresses the question: "does Mark have an employed child?"

== See also ==
- Logical conjunction
- Conjunctive query
