= .QL =

Object-oriented query language

- Paradigm: multi-paradigm, logic-paradigm, object-oriented-paradigm
- Developer: Semmle
- First appeared: 2007
- Typing discipline: static, strong

Major implementations
- SemmleCode

Influenced by
- Datalog

.QL (pronounced "dot-cue-el") is an object-oriented query language used to retrieve data from relational database management systems. It is reminiscent of the standard query language SQL and the object-oriented programming language Java. .QL is an object-oriented variant of a logical query language called Datalog. Hierarchical data can therefore be naturally queried in .QL in a recursive manner.

Queries written in .QL are optimised, compiled into SQL and can then be executed on any major relational database management system. .QL query language is being used in SemmleCode to query a relational representation of Java programs.

.QL is developed at Semmle Limited and is based on the company's proprietary technology.

== Language features ==
.QL has several language features to make queries concise, intuitive and reusable:

- Extensible type hierarchy
- Methods and predicates
- Definition before use

== Example query ==
The sample query below illustrates use of .QL to query a Java program. This is how one would select all classes that contain more than ten public methods:

 from Class c, int numOfMethods
 where numOfMethods = count(Method m| m.getDeclaringType()=c 
                      and m.hasModifier("public"))
       and numOfMethods > 10
 select c.getPackage(), c, numOfMethods

In fact, this query selects not only all classes with more than ten public methods, but also their corresponding packages and the number of methods each class has.

== See also ==
- OQL (Object Query Language)
