= Cut (logic programming) =

Feature in Prolog

The cut, in Prolog, is a goal, written as !, which always succeeds but cannot be backtracked. Cuts can prevent unwanted backtracking, which could add unwanted solutions and/or space/time overhead to a query.

The cut should be used sparingly. While cuts can be inserted into code containing errors, if a test is unnecessary because a cut has guaranteed that it is true, it is good practice to say so in a comment at the appropriate place.

Some programmers call the cut a controversial control facility because it was added for efficiency reasons only and is not a logical formula.

== Types ==
=== Green cut ===
The use of a cut that only improves efficiency is referred to as a green cut. Green cuts are used to make programs more efficient without changing program output. For example:

 gamble(X) :- gotmoney(X),!.
 gamble(X) :- gotcredit(X), \+ gotmoney(X).

This is called a green cut operator. The ! tells the interpreter to stop looking for alternatives; however, if gotmoney(X) fails it will check the second rule. Checking for gotmoney(X) in the second rule may appear redundant since Prolog's appearance is dependent on gotmoney(X) failing before, otherwise the second rule would not be evaluated in the first place. Adding \+ gotmoney(X) guarantees that the second rule will always work, even if the first rule is removed by accident, changed, or moved after the second one.

=== Red cut ===
A cut that is not a green cut, that is, it affects the program in other ways than just improving efficiency, is referred to as a red cut. For example:

 gamble(X) :- gotmoney(X),!.
 gamble(X) :- gotcredit(X).

Proper placement of the cut operator and the order of the rules are required to determine their logical meaning. If for any reason the first rule is removed (e.g. by a cut-and-paste accident) or moved after the second one, the second rule will be broken, i.e., it will not guarantee the rule \+ gotmoney(X).

=== Harmful cut ===
A cut which affects the correctness of the program is a harmful cut. For example:

min(X,Y,X) :- !, X =< Y. % the ! is harmful because if Y<X,
min(X,Y,Y) :- Y < X.     % it will not let to continue to the second rule and will fail
