= DBC =

DBC may refer to:

- dBc, decibels relative to carrier, a measurement in RF engineering
- dB(C), C-weighted decibels, a loudness measurement in acoustics
- Baicheng Chang'an Airport
- CAN DBC files, standardized ASCII files defining the format and purpose of CAN bus messages
- Database connection
- DBC News, a Bangladeshi news channel
- DBC Pierre (born 1961), Australian-born author
- Dead Brain Cells, a Canadian thrash metal band
- Design by contract, a methodology for designing computer software
- Detroit Boat Club, a historic rowing club
- Digital Broadcasting Corporation, a Hong Kong radio broadcaster
- Dread Broadcasting Corporation, the UKs first black music radio station
- Direct-buried cable, a kind of electrical cable
- Direct Bonded Copper, a power electronic substrate
- Martin Nemley, a member of the American hip hop band Stetsasonic

== See also ==
- DBC 1012, a computer produced by Teradata Corporation in the early 1980s
- DBC1 (disambiguation)
- DBCS (disambiguation)
