= Dataupia =

Dataupia Corporation
- Type: Private company
- Industry: Information storage (data warehouse appliance)
- Founded: 2005
- Headquarters: Cambridge, Massachusetts
- Key people: Foster Hinshaw
- Website: www.dataupia.com

Dataupia was a supplier of data warehouse appliances, including server computers storage, and software, for applications running on Oracle and Microsoft SQL Server databases.

Dataupia's name was a portmanteau of the words "data", in reference to the data warehousing industry, and "utopia". The company was headquartered in Cambridge, Massachusetts, with additional offices in Binghamton, United Kingdom.

== History ==
Dataupia was founded in 2005 by Foster D. Hinshaw for analytics in "big data" applications such as for telecom and auto-reporting for the Internet of things.In January 2009, Hinshaw temporarily left due to health problems, and Tony Sirianni became chief executive through November.

During the Great Recession, the company reduced its staff and by August 2009 was seeking a buyer for its assets.

By 2017, the company had not issued a press release since the 4.0 version of the product was announced in February 2011.

== Products and services ==
The Dataupia flagship product, Satori Server, was a network-attached data warehouse appliance announced in 2007. As an appliance, it included an embedded copy of Linux, a database engine, an aggregation engine, built-in storage, and parallel processors. In contrast to other custom-assembly data warehouse appliances, the Satori Server worked with existing database management systems, rather than requiring them to be replaced.

Competitors included Teradata and IBM (which acquired Netezza in 2010).
