= DBCS (disambiguation) =

A DBCS, Double Byte Character Set, is an encoding in which characters are encoded in two bytes.

DBCS may also refer to:

- Delivery Bar Code Sorter, a machine used by the United States Postal Service
- Drakensberg Boys' Choir School, KwaZulu-Natal, South Africa
- Honda VFR800#Dual combined braking system (DCBS)
- Disney Bros. Cartoon Studio, a former name for the Walt Disney Company.

== See also ==
- DBC (disambiguation)
