= Something Ventured =

- Directed by: Daniel Geller; Dayna Goldfine
- Produced by: Daniel Geller; Dayna Goldfine; Celeste Schaefer Snyder
- Music by: Laura Karpman
- Distributed by: Zeitgeist Films
- Release date: May 24, 2011 (San Francisco)
- Running time: 84 minutes
- Country: United States
- Language: English

Something Ventured is a 2011 documentary film investigating the emergence of American venture capitalism in the mid-20th century. The film follows the stories of the venture capitalists who worked with entrepreneurs to start and build companies like Apple, Intel, Genentech, Cisco, Atari, Tandem, and others, and looks at the influence of Georges Doriot. It is a full-length independent film which includes interviews with prominent American venture capitalists and entrepreneurs of the 1960s, 1970s and 1980s, as well as archival photography and footage. The film has aired across the US on local PBS stations as well as on public television in Norway.

Something Ventured features the venture capitalists Arthur Rock, Tom Perkins, Don Valentine, Dick Kramlich, Reid Dennis, Bill Draper, Pitch Johnson, Bill Bowes, Bill Edwards, and Jim Gaither. The entrepreneurs featured in Something Ventured are Gordon Moore (co-founder of Intel), Jimmy Treybig (founder of Tandem), Nolan Bushnell (founder of Atari), Dr. Herbert Boyer (co-founder of Genentech), Mike Markkula (second president/CEO of Apple), Sandy Lerner (co-founder of Cisco), John Morgridge (early CEO of Cisco), and Robert Campbell (founder of what would become PowerPoint).

Something Ventured premiered at the South by Southwest Film Festival in March 2011. The film was co-executive produced by Paul Holland and Molly Davis. Something Ventured was directed by Emmy Award-winning filmmakers Dan Geller and Dayna Goldfine (co-directors of Ballets Russes (film) and Hallelujah: Leonard Cohen, A Journey, A Song). Something Ventured’s North American distribution partner is Zeitgeist Films.

== Press ==
- 'The Risky Dudes Who Wrote the Checks that Made Silicon Valley' December 24, 2012. All Things Digital
- 'Something Ventured' April 24, 2011. San Francisco Chronicle
- 'Something Ventured' KQED Radio. April 22, 2011
- When Venture Capital Was an Adventure Inc. April 22, 2011
- 'Something Ventured' tells story of tech investors San Francisco Chronicle. April 18, 2011
- SXSW Reviews-Something Ventured Variety. April 3, 2011
- Holland Says New Film Features Early Venture Capitalists: Video Bloomberg Television. March 18, 2011
- A Risk Worth Taking The Dylan Ratigan Show. March 15, 2011
- SXSW: "Something Ventured" Directors Talk Venture Capital Early Days TechNewsDaily. March 15, 2011
- The Good Guys in Business CNBC. March, 14th, 2011
- Talking with the Directors of 'Something Ventured' NBC. Austin, Texas. March 12, 2011
- Veni Vidi Venture: The Unlikely Heroes of Big Business The Austin Chronicle. March 11, 2011
- A Film About Capitalism and (Surprise), It's a Love Story The New York Times. March 7, 2011
