= ECircle =

German digital marketing company

eCircle
- Type: Part of Teradata
- Industry: email marketing
- Founded: 1999
- Headquarters: Munich, Germany
- Website: ecircle.com

eCircle was an email marketing and digital marketing provider headquartered in Munich, Germany. The company provided software as a service for email, mobile and social media marketing and opt-in email and lead generation media services. Buyers of the software and advertising products range from corporate marketing departments over to media and advertising agencies.

== History ==
eCircle was established in 1999 by Volker Wiewer and Thomas Wilke and entered the markets in the United Kingdom, Italy and France in 2000. In the same year the company was transformed into a public limited company (plc).

Originally eCircle's business was an email list management service, used to create and recruit members to mailing lists, including an archive of sent messages, similar to the eGroups.com product. The model was adapted to the service which eCircle provided. In 2009, eCircle opened offices in the Netherlands and Spain. In 2010 another office in Poland followed and in 2011 eCircle expanded into the Nordics region with a Scandinavian HQ in Copenhagen.

The company had 4 investors, Wellington Partners, Cipio Partners, Steadfast Capital and TA Associates, totaling €72.5million. In 2010, private equity firm TA Associates invested €60million, as the company estimated more than 200 employees. US-based Teradata announced the final acquisition of eCircle on 4 June 2012, and it was merged into Teradata's Aprimo business. eCircle had in excess of 350 employees in 2012.

== Products ==
eCircle's eC-messenger email marketing application offers features from email broadcasting to complex and automated email campaigns. In 2005 a German email marketing software benchmark study ranked eC-messenger as a 'high-end solution'. eC-messenger was independently reviewed in 2009 by James Lawson of Database Marketing magazine who said "eC-messenger would make a solid platform for any company’s email marketing work…[eC-messenger] won’t disappoint". In 2011, eCircle launched its Social Media Platform eC-social which enables Marketers to plan, implement and evaluate their social media activities from one central platform.

In addition to the email software, eCircle had an opt-in email list rental network. It generated leads for clients via online lead generation campaigns and online portals including Bestbuymoney.co.uk, GlamourExclusive.com, MyTestDrive.co.uk, SpoilMeNow.co.uk, WinGreatPrizes.co.uk and YourHolidayOffers.co.uk.

== Partnerships ==
In 2004 eCircle became certified as a reputable mass email sender in the Certified Senders Alliance, a German whitelist programme. In 2007 eCircle forged a relationship with email delivery company Return Path, Inc. to set up an ISP relations programme 'The Sender Score Receiver Alliance', to optimise delivery security to email addresses in Europe.

eCircle's email marketing technology can be integrated with other technologies such as web analytics, customer relationship management systems, content management systems, e-commerce platforms and data warehouses. Integration partners include: Asknet, Bazaarvoice, Coremetrics, Hybris, Intershop, ComScore, Adobe, Prudsys, Salesforce and WebTrends.

eCircle is a member of the adigital, BVDW, Certified Senders Alliance, DDV, the UK Direct Marketing Association (DMA), Emma-nl, IAB, IAB Italia, Netcomm, Signal Spam, and SNCD. In 2011, eCircle was accredited the DMA DataSeal for its security measures.

== Recognition ==
In 2000, eCircle was listed as one of the top 25 start ups in Germany. Volker Wiewer and Thomas Wilke were named as finalists for the Ernst & Young Entrepreneur of the Year in 2002. In 2004, eCircle was named as the biggest permission-based marketing provider in Germany and was presented with the New Media Award 2004 for its videomail campaign for Unicef.

The following year saw the UK office win its first award with a Bronze in the 'Best Email' category at the DMA Awards with its client Alto Clothing and agency Neoco. In the same year, eCircle Germany were shortlisted at the DMMA 2006 awards for a campaign for sports retailer Karstadt (now Arcandor) in conjunction with Adidas promoting the film 'Goal'.

In 2007 Marketing Magazine in the UK released their annual Digital Agency League Tables and eCircle ranked 7th, moving to 6th place in 2009. eCircle UK was ranked in 5th place in New Media Age magazine's Marketing Services Guide in 2007, moving up to 2nd place in 2009 and reached the top of the table at 1st place in 2010.

eCircle retained its position as number one Email Agency in NMA's Marketing Services Guide in 2011. 2009 saw eCircle winning 'Email Supplier of the Year' at the Eco Internet Awards 2009 and the 'Best Use of Email' Award at the Revolution Awards 2009 alongside Argos. It was additionally shortlisted for the 'Best Use of Email' Award at the NMA Marketing Effectiveness Awards 2009.

In 2010 the UK Managing Director Simon Bowker was elected onto the DMA Email Marketing Council which led to his co-writing of The Deliverability Whitepaper and the writing of the DMA Data Analysis and Segmentation Whitepaper. In 2011 eCircle was shortlisted twice in 'Best Use of Email' category at the Revolution Awards 2011.

At the end of 2011, campaigns using eCircle technology won two awards from the UK Direct Marketing Association: Gold in the best use of email marketing category, and Silver for the best data strategy. In 2012 eCircle were listed in Red Herring's Top 100 Europe.
