= BCU =

BCU may refer to:

== Computing ==
- BIOS configuration utility
- Bus Coupling Unit, an EIB/KNX bus coupler
- IBM Balanced Configuration Unit

== Universities and libraries ==
- Bengaluru City University, formerly Bengaluru Central University, in Karnataka, India
- Bethune–Cookman University
- Birmingham City University
- Briar Cliff University
- Business and Computer University, Lebanon
- Cantonal and University Library of Lausanne, Switzerland (Bibliothèque cantonale et universitaire de Lausanne)

== Other uses ==
- Awad Bing language (ISO 639-2 code "bcu")
- Babish Culinary Universe, a YouTube cooking channel
- Banco Central del Uruguay, official name in Spanish of the Central Bank of Uruguay
- Basic command unit
- British Canoe Union, a former name of Paddle UK
- British Columbia United is a centre-right political party in the province of British Columbia, Canada
- IATA airport code for Bauchi State Airport, Nigeria
- Bumilangit Cinematic Universe, an Indonesian superhero franchise
