= Netezza =

Provider of Integrated Data Warehouse Hardware and Software

- Type: Subsidiary of IBM
- Industry: Data warehousing
- Founded: 1999
- Founder: Foster Hinshaw; Jit Saxena
- Headquarters: Marlborough, Massachusetts, United States
- Products: Data Warehouse Appliance; Integrated Data Warehouse Hardware and Software; Professional Services; Customer Services
- Revenue: ▲US$190.6 million (FY 2010)
- Number of employees: 469 (2010)
- Parent: IBM
- Website: www.netezza.com

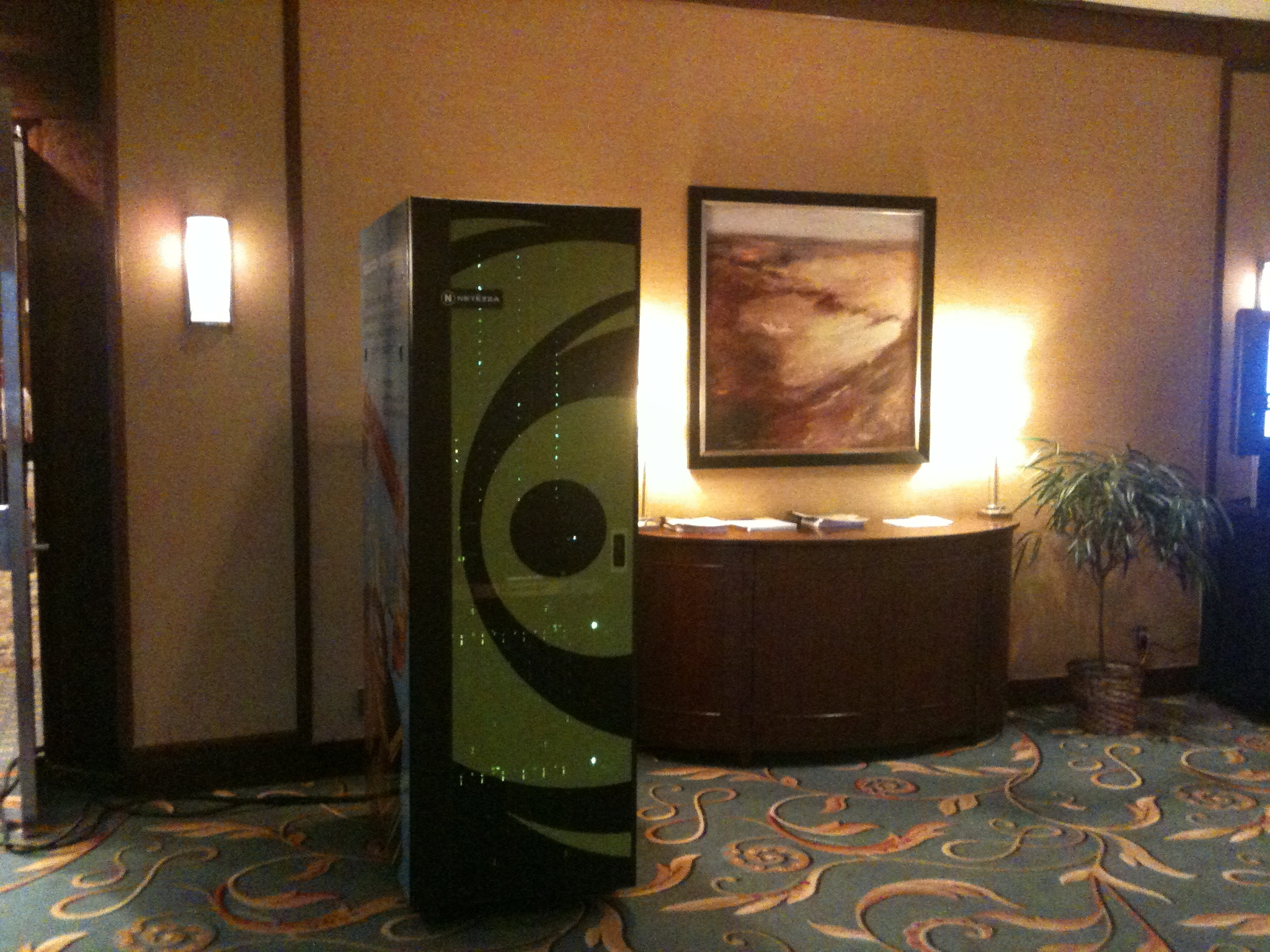
Netezza Massive Parallel Processing Data Warehouse Appliance

IBM Netezza (pronounced ne-teez-a, a word from Urdu language meaning "result") is a subsidiary of American technology company IBM that designs and markets high-performance data warehouse appliances and advanced analytics applications for enterprise uses, including data warehousing, business intelligence, predictive analytics and business continuity planning.

== History ==
Netezza was founded in 1999 by Foster Hinshaw. The company was incorporated in Delaware on December 30, 1999 as Intelligent Data Engines, Inc.

In 2000 Jit Saxena joined Hinshaw as co-founder and the company changed its name to Netezza Corporation in November 2000.

In 2003, Netezza announced the industry's first "data warehouse appliance". Hinshaw coined the term to describe a product of shared nothing parallel nodes specifically targeted for high data volumes for modern data analytics.

In 2005, Hinshaw left Netezza to found Dataupia.In 2006, Jim Baum started at Netezza as chief operating officer.

In July 2007, Netezza Corporation had its IPO (initial public offering)) under the ticker “NZ” on NYSE Arca.

Jim Baum was appointed CEO of Netezza in January 2008 after co-founder Jit Saxena announced his retirement.

On September 20, 2010, IBM and Netezza announced that they entered into a definitive agreement for IBM to acquire Netezza in a cash transaction at a price of $27 per share or at a net price of approximately $1.7 billion, after adjusting for cash.

Between 2010 and 2015, IBM released 4 generations of Netezza Appliances (TwinFin, Skimmer, Striper, Mako), reintroduced in June 2019 as the fourth generation NPS (Netezza Performance Server), part of the IBM CloudPak for Data offering (Hammerhead).

In 2020, IBM revived Netezza as a software-as-a-service product, hosting on both Microsoft Azure and Amazon Web Services (AWS).

In August 2023, IBM Netezza picked up a table format from Apache Iceberg which would extend the reach of Netezza capabilities into a data lakehouse. Furthermore its integration with IBM watsonx.data (released in 2023) allowed it to become a hybrid compute-engine-based data lakehouse solution, extending its strategic importance even further.

== Products ==
TwinFin, Netezza’s primary product, is designed for rapid analysis of data volumes scaling into petabytes. The company introduced the fourth generation of the TwinFin product in August 2009. Netezza introduced a scaled-down version of this appliance under the Skimmer brand in January 2010.

Netezza software was based on PostgreSQL 7.2.In February 2010, Netezza announced that it had opened up its systems to support major programming models, including Hadoop, MapReduce, Java, C++, and Python models.

The company also markets specialized appliances for retail, spatial, complex analytics and regulatory compliance needs. Netezza sells software-based products for migrating from Oracle Exadata and for implementing data virtualization and federation (data abstraction) schemes.

The Netezza appliance was the foundation of IBM DB2 Analytics Accelerator (IDAA).

In 2012, the products were re-branded as IBM PureData for Analytics.

In 2017, IBM released next to Netezza, the Integrated Analytics System using Power-8 processing frame and DB2 as the database engine in an offering called DB2 Warehouse. It featured both row-based and columnar storage, plus high-speed flash drives. The DB2 Warehouse engine runs both in the cloud or on-prem.

In 2019, after acquiring Red Hat, IBM established CloudPak offerings based on OpenShift, and revived Netezza as Netezza Performance Server (NPS) under CloudPak for Data, both of which could run on-prem or in the cloud. The offering is a 64-bit NPS with flash drives and optimized FPGAs. The modernized NPS is 100 percent identical in feature compatibility to Netezza Mako, and moving to this platform required only, either nzmigrate (Netezza migrate) to clone the environment or an nzbackup (Netezza backup)/restore.

In 2020, the first Netezza Performance Server in the cloud was (generally available on Amazon Web Services (AWS). This offering uses the actual AMPP (Asymmetric Massively Parallel Processing) Netezza Hardware, not commodity hardware running Netezza software. Migrating to this platform also requires only an nzmigrate or nzbackup/restore through an S3 bucket. It is also available in Azure and IBM Cloud.

=== Technology ===
Netezza’s proprietary AMPP (Asymmetric Massively Parallel Processing) architecture is a two-tiered system designed to quickly handle very large queries from multiple users.

The first tier is a high-performance Linux SMP host that compiles data query tasks received from business intelligence applications, and generates query execution plans. It then divides a query into a sequence of sub-tasks, or snippets that can be executed in parallel, and distributes the snippets to the second tier for execution.

The second tier consists of one to hundreds of snippet processing blades, or S-Blades, where all the primary processing work of the appliance is executed. The S-Blades are intelligent processing nodes that make up the massively parallel processing (MPP) engine of the appliance. Each S-Blade is an independent server that contains multi-core Intel-based CPUs and Netezza’s proprietary multi-engine, high-throughput FPGAs. The S-Blade is composed of a standard blade-server combined with a special Netezza Database Accelerator card that snaps alongside the blade. Each S-Blade is, in turn, connected to multiple disk drives processing multiple data streams in parallel in TwinFin or Skimmer.

AMPP employs industry-standard interfaces (SQL, ODBC, JDBC, OLE DB) and provides load times in excess of 2 TB/hour and backup/restore data rates of more than 4 TB/hour.

In 2009, the company transitioned from PowerPC processors to Intel CPUs. In August, 2009, with the introduction of the 4th generation TwinFin product, Netezza moved from proprietary blades to IBM blades.
