= Database machine =

A database machines or back end processor is a computer or special hardware that stores and retrieves data from a database. It is specially designed for database access and is tightly coupled to the main (front-end) computer(s) by a high-speed channel, whereas a database server is a general-purpose computer that holds a database and it's loosely coupled via a local area network to its clients.

Database machines can retrieve large amount of data using hundreds to thousands of microprocessors with database software. The front end processor asks the back end (typically sending a query expressed in a query language) the data and further processes it. The back end processor on the other hand analyzes and stores the data from the front end processor. Back end processors result in higher performance, increasing host main memory, increasing database recovery and security, and decreasing cost to manufacture.

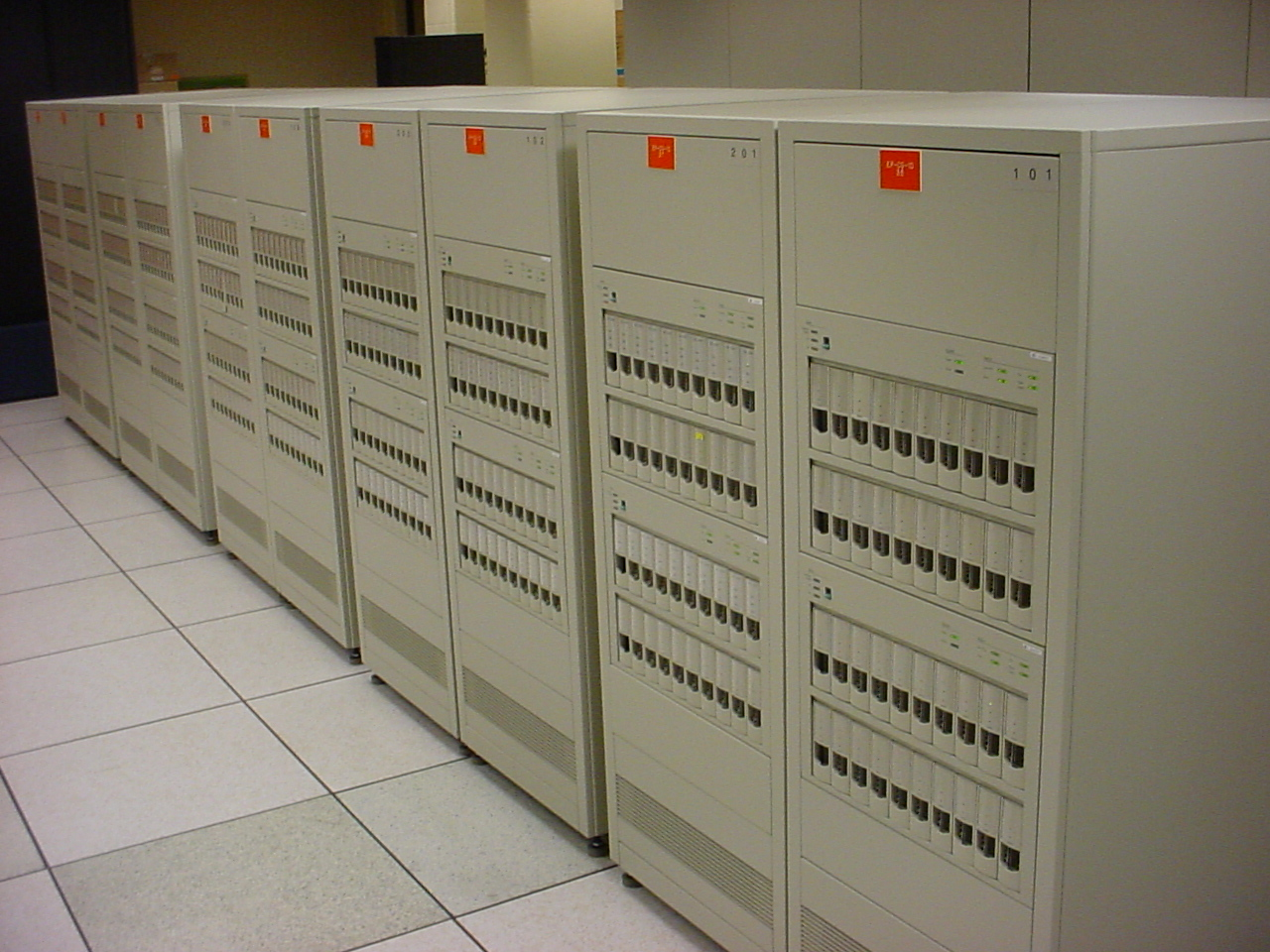
NCR Teradata Worldmark 5100 system (2002)

== History ==
Britton-Lee (IDM), Tandem (Non-Stop System), and Teradata (DBC) all offered early commercial specialized database machines. A more recent example was Oracle Exadata.

== See also ==
- Content Addressable File Store (CAFS)
