= Bruce A. Langos =

American technology executive

- Occupation: Technology executive

Bruce A. Langos is an American technology executive.

== Career ==
Langos joined NCR Corporation in 1976. From 1996 to 2005, he was vice president of the Teradata division of NCR. In 2005, he became senior vice president of global operations and company officer for NCR and served in that position until becoming chief operating officer of Teradata after the spin-off in 2007 until 2016. From 2016 through 2019 Langos at the request of the Sheriff of Montgomery County, Ohio was requested to establish a Criminal Intelligence Center for data sharing amongst the 29 law enforcement organizations in the county. Langos became Executive Director of the Center. In late 2019 Langos became the President of RG Properties/Enterprises a privately held real estate investment, development, and asset management company headquartered in Dayton, Ohio.

Langos holds a seat on Ohio Third Frontier, the state's commission for the economic development of technology and research companies. He was also the Chairman of the Board of the Dayton Development Coalition, and the Chairman of the Humane Society Board of Greater Dayton. Langos also serves on the Board of Trustees for Wright State University.
