= Swarz =

Swarz is a surname. Notable people with the surname include:

- Lou Swarz (1897–?), American actress
- Robert S. Swarz, American electrical and computer engineer
- Sahl Swarz (1912–2004), American sculptor and arts educator
