= DBC1 =

DBC1 may refer to:

- Deleted in bladder cancer 1, a protein encoded by the BRINP1 gene
- Deleted in breast cancer 1, a protein encoded by the CCAR2 gene
- DBC 1, a Hong Kong radio staion; see Digital Broadcasting Corporation
