= Michael Köhler =

Michael Köhler may refer to:

- Michael Köhler (luger)
- Michael Kohler (musician)
- Michael F. Koehler, American technology executive
