= Enscribe =

Hierarchical database

- Original author: Tandem Computers
- Developer: HPE
- Release: early 1980s
- Operating system: NonStop OS
- Platform: NonStop
- Included with: NonStop OS
- Available in: NonStop COBOL, NonStop SCOBOL, NonStop Java, NonStop C, NonStop C++, Tandem Basic, Tandem Fortran, Tandem Ada, Tandem Pascal, Transaction Application Language (TAL), pTAL, epTAL
- Type: DBMS
- License: Proprietary

Enscribe is the native hierarchical database in the commercial HP NonStop (Tandem) servers. It is designed for fault tolerance and scalability and is currently offered by Hewlett Packard Enterprise.

The product was originally developed by Tandem Computers. Tandem was acquired by Compaq in 1997. Compaq was later acquired by Hewlett-Packard in 2002. When Hewlett-Packard split in 2015 into HP Inc. and Hewlett Packard Enterprise, Enscribe and the rest of the NonStop product line went to Hewlett Packard Enterprise.

The product primarily is used for online transaction processing and is tailored for organizations that need high availability and scalability for their database system. Typical users of the product are stock exchanges, telecommunications, POS, and bank ATM networks.

Somewhat similar to Record Management Services on OpenVMS platforms, some Enscribe features are:

- Five disk file structures: unstructured, key-sequenced, queue, entry-sequenced, and relative
- Partitioned (multiple-volume) files
- Multiple-key access to records
- Relational access among files (where a field value from one file is used as a key to access a data record in another file)
- Optional automatic maintenance of all keys
- Optional key compression in key-sequenced data or index blocks
- Support of transaction auditing through the Transaction Management Facility (TMF/MP). TMF is the main functional component of the NonStop Transaction Manager/MP product.
- Optional compression of audit-checkpoint records
- Record level locking and file level locking
- Cache buffering
- Optional sequential block buffering
- Waited and Nowaited I/Os (multi-threading of I/O calls by the programmer)

The NonStop OS Guardian APIs or the utility FUP (File Utility Program) can be used to work with Enscribe files.

A "convert" utility was provided by Tandem to aid in converting Enscribe files to NonStop SQL files, when desired.

Many of the applications developed in HP NonStop servers (often critical ones) run on Enscribe databases.

== History ==
Enscribe is designed to run effectively on parallel computers, adding functionality for distributed data, distributed execution, and distributed transactions.

First released in the early 1980s, and initially carrying an added charge until it was included with the operating system, the product became one of the few hierarchical data base systems that scales almost linearly with the number of processors in the machine: adding a second CPU to an existing server almost exactly doubled its performance.

== See also ==
- NonStop SQL
- NonStop (server computers)
- TACL (Tandem Advanced Command Language)
- Tandem Computers
- Transaction Application Language (TAL)
