= Paula Hawthorn =

American computer scientist

- Born: 1943 (age 82–83); Oklahoma City, Oklahoma, U.S.
- Education: University of Houston (Bachelor's, master's); University of California, Berkeley (PhD)
- Known for: Database systems
- Awards: 1996 EECS Distinguished Alumni Award from UC Berkeley
- Scientific career
- Fields: Computer science
- Workplaces: Texaco; Lawrence Berkeley National Laboratory; Hewlett-Packard; Britton-Lee; Illustra; Informix; Andromedia
- Thesis: Evaluation and Enhancement of the Performance of Relational Database Management Systems (1979)
- Doctoral advisor: Michael Stonebraker

Paula Birdwell Hawthorn (born 1943) is an American computer scientist. She is recognised as an expert and pioneer in database systems. She has also founded organisations for women in computer science and created affirmative action programs to support students in the field.

== Early life and education ==
Hawthorn was born in 1943 in Oklahoma City. Her parents separated soon after she was born, so she moved around frequently as a child with stints in Oklahoma, California, Texas and Indiana. She received her undergraduate degree in mathematics from the University of Houston with the intention of training as a math teacher. However, she was arrested for her involvement in a civil rights protest, making her ineligible to teach. In 1965, before graduating, she took a course on computers and became very interested in programming.

== Career ==
After completing her degree, she worked at Texaco in maintenance on credit card billing systems. She left the position when her children were born and later was interested in returning in a part-time capacity, but this was not permitted. She decided to return to school, and enrolled in a graduate program at the University of Houston. She was supervised by Steve Sherman. Hawthorn completed her master's in 1974 with a thesis entitled A performance evaluation of a CDC 6600 computer.

Encouraged by her supervisor, she applied to doctoral programs in computer science. She was awarded a Ph.D. in Electrical Engineering and Computer Science from the University of California, Berkeley in 1979. Her thesis was on the topic of relational database performance. During her studies at Berkeley, she began working with Michael Stonebraker on the INGRES project where she was a key contributor. After graduating, she worked at the Lawrence Berkeley National Laboratory.

Hawthorn went on to work at Hewlett-Packard as a manager and then at a database startup Britton-Lee, where she became Vice President of Engineering. The company was one of the first to develop specialised standalone database systems for client/server applications. She worked on efficiency comparisons for different types of processors in database machines.

When Britton-Lee started to fail, she returned to HP before being hired as Vice President at Illustra. After Illustra was bought out, she stayed on for a short period before looking for other opportunities. She was hired by Informix, and then by Andromedia in 1997 (which was later acquired by Macromedia). She integrated Andromedia technology with Unicenter TNG and donated software systems to UC Berkeley.

By 2002, Hawthorn was semi-retired, working part-time as a consultant.

Hawthorn has worked on various committees including the Lawler Award Committee and Advisory Panel on Professional Licensing in Software Engineering at the ACM. She was on the Organization Committee for SIGMOD 1987. In 2005, she worked on an ACM Voter Registration Database Study.

== Awards and honours ==
- 1996 EECS Distinguished Alumni Award from UC Berkeley.

== Personal life ==
Hawthorn married her first husband at the start of her undergraduate degree. Their first child was born in 1969 and the second 16 months later. The couple divorced when Hawthorn was pursuing her master's.

She met and married her second husband, Mike Ubell, during her Ph.D.

Hawthorn was involved in the search for Jim Gray, a computer scientist who went missing when sailing off the coast of California.

=== Advocacy ===
Hawthorn has a history of activism and advocacy, starting with civil rights protests in her undergrad days.

Hawthorn is an advocate for women in science and engineering. She started women's groups at Berkeley, LBNL and HP. She was the first president of Berkeley's Women in Computer Science and Electrical Engineering (WiCSE) founded in 1979. As an older student, single parent and woman at Berkeley, she was not perceived as a serious student. By this time, computer science had started to become more recognised as an engineering field with limited spaces and funding in university programs, neither of which were readily available to women. To create more opportunities for minority students, Hawthorn, Barbara Simons and Sheila Humphreys created the Re-entry Program, an initiative through which students could take classes to increase their chances of admission to graduate programs. She has also worked on programs to introduce disadvantaged students to information technology opportunities. Hawthorn is an advocate for affordable and accessible child care, particularly for student parents.

She is also the President of Soldiers Against Violence Everywhere (SAVE) Oakland, the Co-Chair of the Oakland/Alameda County Chapter of the Brady Campaign To Prevent Gun Violence, and a member of the Coalition for Police Accountability. She serves on the Oakland Community Policing Advisory Board.

Hawthorn is a board member of Make Oakland Better Now! as well as Earthworks. She also sponsored a Rainforest Action Network project called REVEL: The Art of Activism.
