= Thomas Perkins (businessman) =

American businessperson

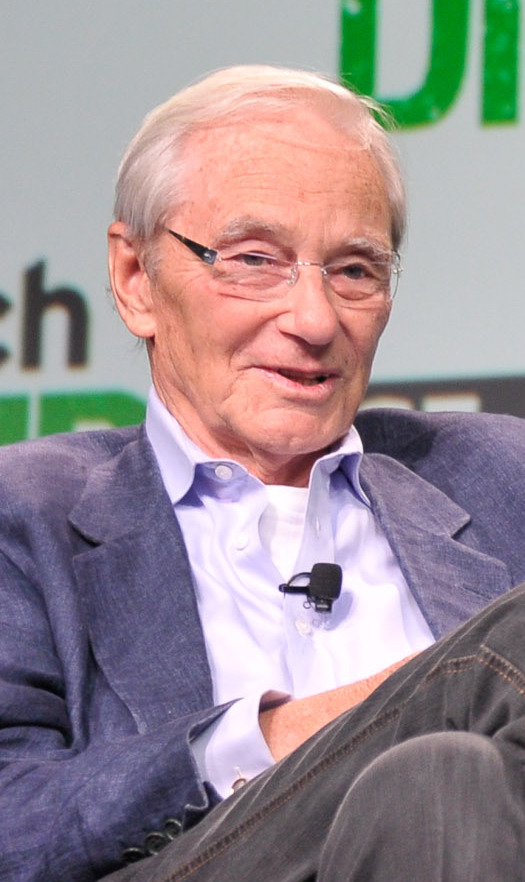
- Perkins in 2013
- Born: Thomas James Perkins; January 7, 1932; White Plains, New York, U.S.
- Died: June 7, 2016 (aged 84); Marin County, California, U.S.
- Education: Massachusetts Institute of Technology (BS); Harvard University (MBA)
- Occupation: venture capitalist
- Known for: Co-founding Kleiner Perkins Caufield & Byers
- Spouse(s): Gerd Thune-Ellefsen (died 1994) Danielle Steel (m. 1998; div. 2002)
- Children: 2

Thomas James Perkins (January 7, 1932 – June 7, 2016) was an American businessman and venture capitalist who was one of the founders of the venture capital firm Kleiner Perkins.

== Biography ==
Perkins received a B.S. in electrical engineering from Massachusetts Institute of Technology (MIT) in 1953. He earned an MBA from Harvard University in 1957. While attending MIT, Perkins joined the Delta Upsilon fraternity. Perkins was mentored by Georges Doriot.

=== Career ===
In 1963, he was invited by Bill Hewlett and David Packard to become the administrative head of the research department at Hewlett-Packard. He was the first general manager of HP's computer divisions, credited with helping shepherd HP's entry into the minicomputer business. During the 1960s, he also started University Laboratories, which was later merged into Spectra-Physics. At University Laboratories he was the co-developer of the first low-cost He-Ne laser, having had the idea of how to directly integrate the laser cavity mirrors inside the plasma tube.

In 1973, with Eugene Kleiner, he founded Kleiner Perkins, one of the first Sand Hill Road venture capital firms. Later, Frank J. Caufield and Brook Byers joined the firm, eventually becoming named partners. Perkins was a director at Applied Materials, Compaq, Corning Glass, Genentech, Hewlett-Packard, and Philips Electronics. He was chairman of Tandem Computers, from its founding in 1974 until its 1997 merger with Compaq. Perkins was also chairman of Genentech from 1976 until 1990, when it merged with Roche Holding Ltd.

During the HP/Compaq merger fight in 2001, Perkins was a member of the Compaq board and an outspoken supporter of the merger. He joined the HP board of directors in the merger, retired, and officially rejoined the HP board days before Carly Fiorina was forced to resign from her posts as chairman and chief executive officer of HP. Perkins led efforts to force Fiorina out.

==== Resignation from HP Board ====
Perkins resigned from HP's board on May 18, 2006, over the actions taken by the board's chair, Patricia C. Dunn, to determine the board-level source of media leaks using methods Perkins considered unethical and possibly illegal. HP gave no cause in the SEC-required 8-K filing, and according to Perkins refused to amend the filing to indicate his reasons for resigning. In response, Perkins disclosed his reasons publicly, triggering an SEC investigation and significant media interest into HP's leak-finding activities.

Perkins's residential phone records were obtained through a method known as pretexting. AT&T confirmed that someone pretended to be Perkins, using his phone number and his Social Security Number. HP confirmed that the investigative firm they hired used pretexting to obtain information on the call records of the directors. HP's investigation found that Dr. George Keyworth was the source of several leaks. At the May 18, 2006 board meeting, Keyworth admitted to leaking information but refused to resign after the board passed a resolution calling for his resignation. HP's board decided on August 31, 2006, to not renominate Keyworth for another term as director.

The Securities and Exchange Commission and the State of California began inquiries into the methods used by HP to investigate its directors.

==== News Corp. board ====
Perkins sat on the board of directors of Rupert Murdoch's News Corporation along with Viet D. Dinh. Dinh represented Perkins in the HP board affair. In July, 2011, Dinh and fellow News Corp. board member Joel Klein took over the investigation of the News of the World phone hacking affair and related Corporation issues. One business commentator, noting Perkins' prior experience with phone-hacking in the HP scandal, speculated that Perkins "may be [was the] best hope" as News Corp. sought to work out of its phone-hacking scandal. Perkins did not stand for reelection to the News Corp board for the fiscal year of 2012.

== Personal life ==
As of 2014, Perkins was worth an estimated $8 billion. He had two children, with his first wife, the late Gerd Thune-Ellefsen. After she died in 1994, he married romance novelist Danielle Steel in March 1998; her book The Klone and I was about their friendship. They separated in August 1999 and were later amicably divorced.

In 1996, Perkins was convicted in France of involuntary manslaughter arising from a yacht-racing collision and was fined $10,000.

Perkins was the subject of a 2007 60 Minutes special titled "Captain of Capitalism", which focused on his memoir and featured a tour of his yacht. He was also featured in the documentary film Something Ventured, which premiered in 2011.

=== Criticism for "Kristallnacht" comment ===
In January 2014, the Wall Street Journal published a letter from Perkins that compared the "progressive war on the American one percent" of wealthiest Americans and the Occupy movement's "demonization of the rich" to the Kristallnacht and anti-semitism in Nazi Germany:

Writing from the epicenter of progressive thought, San Francisco, I would call attention to the parallels of fascist Nazi Germany to its war on the "one percent", namely its Jews, to the progressive war on the American one percent, namely the "rich."

The letter was widely criticized and condemned in The Atlantic, The Independent, among bloggers, Twitter users, and "his own colleagues in Silicon Valley". Perkins subsequently apologized for making the comparisons with Nazi Germany, but otherwise stood by his letter, saying, "In the Nazi era it was racial demonization, now it's class demonization."

A month after publication of the letter in the Wall Street Journal, Perkins stated in a Commonwealth Club interview (which can be seen on YouTube) when asked at the ending for his 60-minute "Plan to Save the World" he said that he believed elections should be set up such that the number of votes a person can cast would be proportional to the amount of taxes that the person pays. Both Perkins, the moderator and the audience were laughing. In an interview afterwards, Perkins said "I intended to be outrageous, and it was."

=== Homes and yachts ===
Perkins had houses in Belvedere, Marin County, California, and spent about two months a year at Plumpton Place, his Elizabethan mansion in East Sussex, England, which once belonged to Led Zeppelin guitarist Jimmy Page. In 2010, he purchased the penthouse atop the Millennium Tower on Mission Street in San Francisco's financial district.

In July 2006, he formally launched his 289-foot (88 m) sailing yacht named The Maltese Falcon, at the time the world's largest privately owned sailing yacht. The yacht was listed for sale in 2006 on Yachtworld.com, the asking price being €99m with engine hours listed at 1,890 hours. Perkins sold the yacht for £60 million in July 2009.

In 2011, Perkins acquired a Japanese fisheries training vessel, and had it converted into an "adventure" yacht named Dr. No which is used to carry a "Deep Flight" submarine, manufactured by Hawkes Ocean Technologies, of Richmond California. The boat has a website which carries a link to a video documenting encounters with Humpback whales at depth in Tonga.

=== Death ===
Perkins died June 7, 2016, after a prolonged illness at his home in Marin County, California, aged 84.

== Books ==
- Classic Supercharged Sports Cars (ISBN 0-9612268-0-3) Published in 1984, this is Perkins's account of pre-World War II classic car collection.
- Sex and the Single Zillionaire, (ISBN 0-06-085167-8) published In January 2006, this is Perkins first romance novel, which he dedicated to Steel. The plot of the book is based on a reality TV idea which was pitched to Perkins, where he would date a series of women and choose one to marry. He claims that "no 'ghost' did the writing." Proceeds from the book will be donated to Harvard University.
- Valley Boy: The Education of Tom Perkins. (ISBN 1-59-240313-1) published in November 2007, this is Perkins's memoir. Perkins discussed the book, his time at HP, and his sailboat with Lesley Stahl on 60 Minutes in September 2007.
- Mine's Bigger: The Extraordinary Tale of the World's Greatest Sailboat and the Silicon Valley Tycoon Who Built It. An account of Perkins' building of The Maltese Falcon – by Newsweek's David A. Kaplan – was published in 2007. The book in 2008 won the Gerald Loeb Award for best business book of the year.
