= Illustra =

Database software

- Developer: Illustra Information Technologies
- Final release: 3.3 / July, 1997
- Type: DBMS, ORDBMS
- License: Commercial proprietary software

Illustra was a commercialized version of the Postgres object-relational database management system (DBMS) sold by Illustra Information Technologies, a company founded in 1992 and formed by Michael Stonebraker, Gary Morgenthaler and several of Michael Stonebraker's current and former students including: Wei Hong, Jeff Meredith, Michael Olson, Paula Hawthorn, Jeff Anton, Cimarron Taylor and Michael Ubell.

The technology's extensibility model centered on DataBlade modules that defined types and associated index methods, operators, and functions for purposes and data domains that included Web publishing, search and manipulation of text, and management of geospatial information. It enabled all kinds of structured and unstructured multimedia data types to be stored as true objects in existing databases, and not just as parcels of data with object wrappers a la Oracle Corp.

In 1995, NASA decided Illustra would be the right tool to store and manipulate millions of satellite photographs. The only stumbling block was the company size: with only 150 employees, Illustra didn't have the manpower or the scale to support the NASA project.

The company was sold to Informix Corporation in 1996 for $400 million, 40 times revenue. Stonebraker's share was $6.5 million, and he became CTO of Informix after the merger, a position he held until September 2000. The technology was folded into the Informix 7 OnLine product line, shipped in December 1996, leading eventually to the creation of the unified Informix Universal Server (IUS) product line, or more generally, Version 9.

The entire Informix product line was sold to IBM, which continued to extend Informix, offering several editions for use under various license metrics (including two editions which are free of charge). In April 2017, IBM delegated active development and support to HCL Technologies for 15 years while keeping part of the marketing responsibilities.
