= NonStop (server computers) =

Family of fault-tolerant servers

- Developer: Hewlett Packard Enterprise
- Manufacturer: Hewlett Packard Enterprise
- Type: Computer Server
- Availability: 1976 to current
- Operating system: NonStop OS
- Predecessor: Tandem Computers Incorporated

NonStop OS
- Working state: Current
- Source model: Closed-source
- Latest release: L25.09 / September 2025; 10 months ago
- License: Proprietary
- Official website: hpe.com/info/nonstop

NonStop is a series of server computers introduced to market in 1976 by Tandem Computers Incorporated, beginning with the NonStop product line. It was followed by the Tandem Integrity NonStop line of lock-step fault-tolerant computers, now defunct (not to be confused with the later and much different Hewlett-Packard Integrity product line extension). The original NonStop product line is currently offered by Hewlett Packard Enterprise since Hewlett-Packard Company's split in 2015. Because NonStop systems are based on an integrated hardware/software stack, Tandem and later HPE also developed the NonStop OS operating system for them.

NonStop systems are, to an extent, self-healing. To circumvent single points of failure, they are equipped with almost all redundant components. When a mainline component fails, the system automatically falls back to the backup.

These systems can be used by banks, stock exchanges, payment applications, retail companies, energy and utility services, healthcare organizations, manufacturers, telecommunication providers, transportation, and other enterprises requiring extremely high uptime. In 2002, 95% of worldwide stock transactions and two-thirds of credit card transactions were handled by NonStop computers.

== History ==
Originally introduced in 1976 by Tandem Computers Inc., the line was later owned by Compaq (from 1997), Hewlett-Packard Company (from 2003) and Hewlett Packard Enterprise (since 2015). In 2005, the HP Integrity "NonStop i" (or TNS/E) servers, based on Intel Itanium microprocessors, was introduced. In 2014, the first "NonStop X" (or TNS/X) systems, based on Intel x86-64 processors, were introduced. Sales of the Itanium-based systems ended in July 2020.

Early NonStop applications had to be specifically coded for fault tolerance. That requirement was removed in 1983 with the introduction of the Transaction Monitoring Facility (TMF), along with Pathway transaction management software and SCOBOL applications (or, later, NonStop Tuxedo transaction management software), which handles the various aspects of fault tolerance on the system level.

== Software ==
NonStop OS is a message-based operating system designed for fault tolerance. It works with process pairs and ensures that backup processes on redundant CPUs take over in case of a process or CPU failure. Data integrity is maintained during those takeovers; no transactions or data are lost or corrupted.

The operating system includes the Guardian layer, which is a low-level component of the operating system, and the Open System Services (OSS) personality which runs atop this layer, which implements a Unix-like interface for other components of the OS to use.

The operating system and application are designed to support the fault tolerant hardware. The operating system monitors the status of all components, switching control as necessary to maintain operations. Software programs can be written as continuously available programs using a pair of processes where one process performs all the primary processing and the other serves as a "hot backup", receiving updates to data whenever the primary reaches a critical point in processing. Should the primary stop, the backup steps in to resume execution using the current transaction.

The systems support relational database management systems like NonStop SQL and hierarchical databases such as Enscribe.

Languages supported include Java, C, C++, COBOL, SCOBOL (Screen COBOL), Transaction Application Language (TAL), etc. It uses the scripting and job control language TACL (Tandem Advanced Command Language), and is written in TAL and C.

== Hardware ==
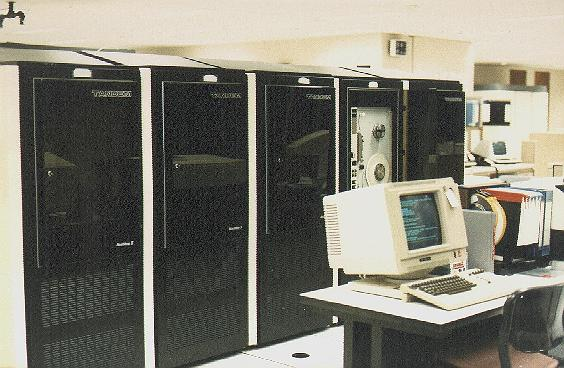
A NonStop server in 1987.

The HPE Integrity NonStop computers are a line of fault-tolerant, message-based server computers based on the Intel Xeon processor platform, and optimized for transaction processing. Average availability levels of 99.999% have been observed. NonStop systems have a massively parallel processing (MPP) architecture that provides linear scalability. Each CPU runs a copy of the operating system, and systems can be expanded to over 4000 CPUs. This is a shared-nothing architecture—also known as loosely coupled multiprocessing.

Due to the integrated hardware/software stack and a single system image, system management requirements for NonStop systems are simplified. In most deployments there is a single system image, not a complex server farm.

Most customers also have a backup server in a remote location for IT disaster recovery. There are standard products to keep the data of the production and the backup server synchronized, for example, HPE's Remote Database Facility (RDF), hence there is fast takeover and little to no data loss in a disaster situation with the production server being disabled or destroyed.

HP also developed a data warehouse and business intelligence server line, HP Neoview, based on the NonStop line. It acted as a database server, providing NonStop OS and NonStop SQL, but lacked the transaction processing functionality of the original NonStop systems. The line was retired, and no longer marketed, as of 24 January 2011.

== See also ==
- List of compilers – includes some compilers for NonStop
- Master-checker
- Reliability engineering
- Stratus Technologies

== Sources ==
- Siewiorek, Daniel P.; Swarz, Robert S. (1998). Reliable Computer Systems. A K Peters, Limited. pp. 586–625. ISBN 1-56881-092-X.
- Horst, R.W. (February 1995). "TNet: a reliable system area network". IEEE Micro. 15 (1): 37–45. Bibcode:1995IMicr..15a..37H. doi:10.1109/40.342016.
- Horst, Robert W.; Harris, Richard L.; Jardine, Robert L. (1990). "Multiple instruction issue in the NonStop Cyclone processor". Proceedings of the 17th Annual International Symposium on Computer Architecture. pp. 216–226. doi:10.1109/ISCA.1990.134528.
- Bernick, D. (2005). "NonStop advanced architecture". Proceedings of the 2005 International Conference on Dependable Systems and Networks. doi:10.1109/DSN.2005.70.
- Kim, Won (March 1984). "Highly Available Systems for Database Applications". ACM Computing Surveys. 16: 71–98. doi:10.1145/861.866. S2CID 4397686.
- Katzman, J. A. (1977). System architecture for NonStop computing. In Proceedings of the CompCon (Feb). IEEE Computer Society, Los Angeles, California. pp. 77–80.
- Katzman, J. A. (1978). A fault tolerant computer system. In Proceedings of the 1978 International Conference on System Sciences (Honolulu, Hawaii, Jan.).
- Bartlett, Joel (1978). A nonstop operating system. In Proceedings of the 1978 International Conference on System Sciences (Honolulu, Hawaii, Jan.).
- Borr, Andrea (1981). Transaction monitoring in ENCOMPASS: Reliable distributed transaction processing. In Proceedings of the 7th International Conference on Very Large Databases (Cannes, France, September 9–11). IEEE, New York, pp. 155–165. Association for Computing Machinery, New York.
