= Jimmy Treybig =

Founder of Tandem Computers, manufacturer of the first fault tolerant computers (b. 1940)

- Born: James G. Treybig; September 28, 1940; Texas
- Education: Stanford University (MBA, 1968); Rice University (BA, 1963; BSEE, 1964)
- Known for: Founder of Tandem Computers Inc.
- Successor: Roel Pieper (at Tandem Computers Inc. in 1996)
- Awards: Entrepreneur of the Year (Stanford University, 1980) Entrepreneur of the Year (Harvard University, 1981) 'Torch of Liberty' (Anti-Defamation League of B’Nai B’Rith, 1983) 100 people who changed the world (Upside Magazine) Visionary Award of Silicon Valley Pioneers (The Silicon Valley Forum, 2002).

James G. Treybig is the founder of Tandem Computers, which designed and manufactured the first fault tolerant computers, in 1974. These pioneering computers were marketed to transaction processing customers, who used them for ATMs, banks, stock exchanges, phone companies, 911 and military applications.

== Early life and education ==
Treybig grew up in Bellaire, Texas, and attended Bellaire High School from 1956 to 1959. He then went to Rice University, where he received a B.A. degree in 1963 and a bachelor's degree in electrical engineering in 1964; following that he went to Stanford Graduate School of Business, where he earned an MBA in 1968.

== Career ==
Treybig's first job after graduating from Rice was as a salesman for Texas Instruments. After receiving his MBA, he worked for Hewlett-Packard (HP) in 1968, serving as marketing section manager on the HP 3000 project, the first commercial minicomputer with a full featured operating system with time-sharing, released in 1973. In 1973, he joined Kleiner Perkins venture capital company.

In 1974, he founded Tandem Computers, funded in part by Kleiner Perkins.

Treybig served as CEO of Tandem Computers from 1974 to 1996. The business plan included detailed ideas for building a corporate culture reflecting Treybig's values, such as paid six week sabbaticals every four years for all employees, an annual gift of 100 shares of Tandem stock to all employees, a weekly all-employee party, and a world-wide closed circuit monthly telecast to keep employees informed. Under his leadership, Tandem delivered its first product in 1976, first issued public stock in 1977, and in 1980 was ranked by Inc. magazine as the fastest-growing public company in America. When Treybig left the company in 1996, Tandem was a $2.3 billion company employing approximately 8,000 people worldwide. He was succeeded by Roel Pieper. Tandem was acquired by Compaq in 1997, and Compaq was merged with Hewlett-Packard in 2002. The product line was later merged into Hewlett Packard Enterprise (HPE) when HP split.

== Awards ==
Upside Magazine recognized Treybig as one of the 100 people who changed the world and The Silicon Valley Forum awarded him the Visionary Award of Silicon Valley Pioneers in 2002. Both Harvard University (1981) and Stanford University (1980) recognized him with their Entrepreneur of the Year awards. The Anti-Defamation League of B’Nai B’Rith awarded him the “Torch of Liberty Award” for outstanding service to the community (1983).

== Post Tandem ==
Treybig was then briefly associated with Austin Ventures; and in August 2002, he became a venture partner at New Enterprise Associates, an association that continues to the present. Treybig was featured in the documentary film Something Ventured, which premiered in 2011.

== Personal life ==
Treybig lives in Austin, Texas, and is active on amateur radio (6-meter band, call sign W6JKV), a hobby he has enjoyed since high school.
