= Stephen Brobst =

American technology executive

Stephen Brobst (born September 21, 1962) is an American technology executive.

== Early life and education ==
Brobst was born September 21, 1962, at the hospital on Stanford University campus where both of his parents did their undergraduate studies. In his childhood years he participated in chess tournaments sponsored by the United States Chess Federation (USCF) and in league competitions between high schools in Silicon Valley. He was president of his high school chess club. He graduated as valedictorian from Milpitas High School in 1980.

For his undergraduate work, he studied Electrical Engineering and Computer Science at University of California, Berkeley where he graduated in just three years and was bestowed the Bechtel Engineering Award as the highest honor for a graduating senior in the college of engineering for academic excellence and leadership.

Brobst performed master's and PhD research at the Massachusetts Institute of Technology (MIT) in the Computer Science and Artificial Intelligence Laboratory (CSAIL) where his dissertation work focused on load balancing and resource allocation for massively parallel computing architectures. He also holds an MBA with joint course and thesis work at the Harvard Business School and the MIT Sloan School of Management. At MIT he was bestowed the William Stewart Award for contributions to student life during his nearly ten years as a graduate resident and tutor at the Baker House undergraduate dormitory.

== Career ==
=== Early career ===
After working at Lawrence Livermore National Laboratory, IBM Research Division in San Jose, and Hewlett-Packard Laboratories in Palo Alto, Brobst founded multiple start-up companies focused on data management products and services. He founded Strategic Technologies & Systems (STS) in 1983 while he was a graduate student at MIT. STS was acquired by NCR Corporation in 1999. From 1993 through 2000 he was co-founder and chief technology officer at Tanning Technology Corporation, a services firm focusing primarily on the implementation of Oracle databases for transaction processing. Tanning executed an initial public offering in 1999 on NASDAQ and was later acquired by Platinum Technologies. He co-founded NexTek Software in 1994, a firm that created a software product for workload management for relational database management systems, as a spinoff from Tanning Technology Corporation. IBM acquired technology from NexTek in 1998 which provided the software foundation for early versions of the DB2 Query Patroller. Brobst was involved in the creation of eHealthDirect, a software start-up for automated claims adjudication using rule-based systems for the health care industry, between 1999 and 2003. eHealthDirect (later renamed to DeNovis) was acquired by HealthEdge in 2003.

=== Teradata ===
Simultaneous with the acquisition of Strategic Technologies & Systems in 1999, NCR Corporation created a separate division for the Teradata relational database management system. Brobst was appointed as chief technology officer for the newly formed Teradata Division and continued to serve in this capacity until January 2024. Brobst was part of the management team that spun Teradata off as a separate company from NCR Corporation to go public on the New York Stock Exchange on October 1, 2007.

=== Ab Initio Software ===
Brobst joined Ab Initio Software as chief technology officer in January 2024. He had previously worked with the co-founders of Ab Initio Software in the early 1990s while consulting on the implementation of Oracle Parallel Query for the CM-5 at Thinking Machines Corporation, an MIT spinoff from CSAIL and early leader in massively parallel processing architectures focused on AI applications. He and the systems integration and consulting company that he founded, Strategic Technologies & Systems, had worked on many of the early deployments of the Ab Initio Co>Operating System prior to his company being acquired by NCR Corporation in 1999.

=== PCAST ===
During Barack Obama's first term, Brobst was appointed to the United States President's Council of Advisors on Science and Technology (PCAST) in the working group on Networking and Information Technology Research and Development (NITRD). As part of this work, he co-authored a report, “Designing a Digital Future: Federally Funded Research and Development in Networking and Information Technology”, delivered to Obama and the United States Congress in December 2010. This report recommended that all federal agencies should have a Big Data strategy and initiated government investment in this area.

Brobst served as an advisor to the National Academy of Sciences in the area of IT workforce development in 1998 and 1999.

== Teaching ==
Brobst lectured at Boston University in the computer science department between 1984 and 1992 while working toward his PhD at MIT. He taught undergraduate courses in operating system design, data structures and algorithms. He taught graduate courses in advanced database design as well as parallel computer architecture. Brobst has taught at The Data Warehousing Institute (later renamed Transforming Data With Intelligence) since 1996 and is a TDWI Fellow.

In 2001 Brobst worked with a team of academics in Pakistan to develop a course curriculum for data warehouse design and AI/ML deployment. He participates in the Girls Who Code initiative, teaching computer science concepts to high school girls.

== Recognition ==
In 2014 Brobst was ranked by Advisory Cloud as the fourth best CTO in the United States behind the CTOs of Amazon, Intel, and Tesla. He is an elected member of the Eta Kappa Nu, Tau Beta Pi, and Sigma Pi engineering honor societies. He is also a nominated member of the New York Academy of Sciences.

== Publications and patents ==
Brobst co-authored the chapter on big data for the Handbook of Computer Science (published by the Association for Computing Machinery in 2014). He also co-authored a report, “Designing a Digital Future: Federally Funded Research and Development in Networking and Information Technology”, delivered to President Barack Obama and the United States Congress in December 2010. In addition, he co-authored “Building a Data Warehouse for Decision Support” (published by Prentice Hall PTR in both English and Polish in 1997 and 1999, respectively).

Brobst authored journal and conference papers in the fields of data management and parallel computing environments. He was a contributing editor for Intelligent Enterprise Magazine and published technical articles in The International Journal of High-Speed Computing, Communications of the ACM, The Journal of Data Warehousing, Enterprise Systems Journal, DM Review, Database Programming and Design, DBMS Tools & Techniques, DB2 Magazine, Oracle Magazine, Teradata Magazine, and many others.

Brobst holds patents in the areas of advanced data management and machine learning, primarily in domains of workload management for database systems, advanced algorithms for cost-based optimization and SQL query re-writes, and health care analytics.
