= Aster Data Systems =

Teradata Aster Analytics
- Type: Public, Part of Teradata Corp
- Industry: Advanced Analytics
- Founded: 2005 in San Carlos, California
- Fate: Acquired
- Products: Teradata Aster Analytics
- Parent: Teradata
- Website: www.teradata.com/Teradata-Aster/overview

Aster Data Systems was a data management and analysis software company headquartered in San Carlos, California. It was founded in 2005 and acquired by Teradata in 2011.

== History ==
Aster Data was co-founded in 2005 by Stanford University graduate students George Candea, Mayank Bawa, and Tasso Argyros. It received funding from First Round Capital, Sequoia Capital, Institutional Venture Partners, Cambrian Ventures, Jafco Ventures as well as angel investors, including Rajeev Motwani, Ron Conway and David Cheriton. It received its first round of funding of $5 million in 2005, a second round of $17 million in February 2009, and third round of $30 million in September 2010.

Aster was mentioned in 2010 by Intelligent Enterprise' editor. It was ranked seventh in 2011 of venture-funded companies by The Wall Street Journal. Argyros (Chief Technical Officer at the time) was listed as a technology pioneer of information technology and new media by the World Economic Forum in 2011.

Teradata had acquired an 11 percent ownership interest in Aster Data Systems in September 2010. On March 3, 2011, Teradata agreed to pay an additional $263 million for the remaining ownership interest, net of debt and other expenses. The acquisition completed in April 2011. In September 2011 a computer appliance version of the product was announced, with pre-configured software bundled with hardware. Aster Data hosted a "Data Analytics Summit" trade show through 2012, made up of regional events.

In October 2012, Aster announced a second version of its appliance. In addition to the Aster database software, another appliance was available with nodes running the Hortonworks distribution of Apache Hadoop.

In October 2013, version 6 of Aster database software was announced. It supported graph database technology, and a file system that the company said was compatible with the Hadoop distributed file system. After Bawa left the company in 2014, he was named a young achiever by the Indian Institute of Technology Bombay (from which he graduated in 1999).

In June 2014, Teradata announced a product using the R programming language. In February 2015, Teradata announced an "AppCenter" using Aster technology. In October, 2015 Teradata announced a set of analytics techniques and applications to run on Apache Hadoop, marketed for the Internet of things. In 2016, Aster Analytics was made available on Amazon AWS Marketplace for self-service, DIY customers. It became available at Microsoft Azure Marketplace in 2017.
