= ServerNet =

Switched fabric communications link

ServerNet is a switched fabric communications link primarily used in proprietary computers made by Tandem Computers, Compaq, and HP.

Its features include good scalability, clean fault containment, error detection and failover. The ServerNet architecture specification defines a connection between nodes, either processor or high performance I/O nodes such as storage devices.

== History ==
Tandem Computers developed the original ServerNet architecture and protocols for use in its own proprietary computer systems starting in 1992, and released the first ServerNet systems in 1995. Early attempts to license the technology and interface chips to other companies failed, due in part to a disconnect between the culture of selling complete hardware / software / middleware computer systems and that needed for selling and supporting chips and licensing technology. A follow-on development effort ported the Virtual Interface Architecture to ServerNet with PCI interface boards connecting personal computers. Infiniband directly inherited many ServerNet features. As of 2017, systems still ship based on the ServerNet architecture.
