= Oracle Zero Data Loss Recovery Appliance =

Computing Platform By Oracle

Oracle Recovery Appliance
- Original author(s): Oracle Corporation
- Initial release: September, 2014
- Operating system: Oracle Linux
- Platform: Zero Data Loss Recovery Appliance
- License: Commercial
- Website: www.oracle.com/zdlra

The Oracle Zero Data Loss Recovery Appliance (Recovery Appliance or ZDLRA) is a computing platform that includes Oracle Corporation (Oracle) Engineered Systems hardware and software built for backup and recovery of the Oracle Database. It performs continuous data protection, validates backups, automatically resolves many issues, and provides alerts when backups fail validation.

It is designed for Oracle databases and works only on Oracle databases. It is considered a 3rd party backup and recovery product. It was introduced in 2014 as part of Oracle Corporation's family of "Engineered Systems" and shares components with the Oracle Exadata Database Machine, with an additional layer of software that provides specific features for backup, recovery, replication, monitoring, and management. Like the Oracle Exadata Database Machine, it is periodically refreshed as a new interoperable and expandable “generation” based on newer hardware technology at the time of release. In September 2019, the Recovery Appliance X8M introduced a 100 Gbit/s internal network fabric based on RoCE (RDMA over Converged Ethernet), replacing the InfiniBand fabric used in previous Recovery Appliance generations.

The Recovery Appliance elastic configuration starts with a "Base Rack" that can be increased to a "Full Rack" or larger "multi-rack" configuration. A Base Rack is capable of managing over 207 terabytes of backup data, while a Full Rack can manage over 1.26 petabytes. Multi-Rack configurations of up to 18 racks wide can manage more than 22 petabytes of data. Since Recovery Appliance only needs to store data that has changed, the actual size of databases that are protected can be many times larger than the storage capacity of a Recovery Appliance.

ZDLRA Generation	Release Date	Base Rack Capacity	Full Rack Capacity	Full Rack Backup and Restore Rate
X4	2014	37 TB	224 TB	12 TB/hour
X5	2015	50 TB	340 TB	12 TB/hour
X6	2016	94 TB	580 TB	12 TB/hour
X7	2017	119 TB	729 TB	24 TB/hour
X8 & X8M	2019	155 TB	949 TB	24 TB/hour
X9M	2021	207 TB	1.26 PB	24 TB/hour
