= RainStor =

- Type: Private
- Industry: Information Technology, Software
- Founded: Founded as Clearpace in 2002; Renamed as RainStor in 2009
- Founders: Tom Longshaw; Andrew Wright; Jonathan Teague; Keith Summers; Gary Pratley
- Fate: Acquired by Teradata
- Headquarters: San Francisco, California, United States
- Website: www.rainstor.com

RainStor was a software company that developed a database management system. The company originated as a project by the United Kingdom's Ministry of Defence to store volumes of data from field operations for ongoing analysis and training purposes.

RainStor was headquartered in San Francisco, California, United States, with R&D in Gloucester, United Kingdom. The company was acquired by Teradata in 2014, and in December 2016 Teradata removed Rainstor from its portfolio.

== History ==
RainStor, originally named Clearpace, was founded in 2002 in the United Kingdom. The company was created to exploit technology that was developed by the United Kingdom's Ministry of Defence to store big data under the brand name DeX. The company rebranded DeX as NParchive, which deduplicated and archived rarely used data, in 2008.

The company and product were renamed to RainStor (a portmanteau of relational archiving infrastructure storage) in December 2009, coinciding with a move of the management office from the United Kingdom to San Francisco. The release of version 3.5 of RainStor software, announced in May 2009, coincided with the company's rebranding. RainStor received $7.5 million in venture funding from Storm Ventures, Doughty Hanson Technology Ventures, Informatica, and The Dow Company in March 2010. In 2011, it received some marketing awards. In October 2012, RainStor received $12 million in venture funding from Credit Suisse, Doughty Hanson Technology Ventures, Storm Ventures, the Dow Chemical Company, and Rogers Venture Partners. In October 2012, the company reported over 100 clients, including government agencies and telecommunications and finance companies, and in 2014, Teradata acquired RainStor.

== Product ==
RainStor provided software for query and analysis against large volumes of machine-generated data and an online data archive for regulatory compliance data retention.

In October 2012, RainStor held two patents and was pursuing five additional patents. The database uses a row/columnar hybrid repository. The archived data is accessed using Structured Query Language (SQL). RainStor software uses partition filtering, which excludes certain records from processing.

RainStor runs on Apache Hadoop. In June 2013, RainStor released version 5.5 of its software, which added user authentication protocols, access controls and policies, data encryption, and user activity logs.

In May 2014, the company announced protection for data from manipulation, malicious attacks, breaches, or deletion.

Since Teradata removed Rainstor from its portfolio in December 2016, it is no longer being developed or marketed.
