= IBM Balanced Configuration Unit =

The IBM Data Warehousing Balanced Configuration Unit is a family of data warehousing servers from IBM. IBM introduced the Balanced Configuration Unit (BCU) for AIX in 2005, and the BCU for Linux in 2006. The BCU is a "balanced" combination of computer server hardware (cpus, I/O channels, and storage) combined with DB2 Data Warehouse Edition (DB2 DWE) software to form a data warehouse "appliance like" system to compete with systems such as Greenplum, DATAllegro, Netezza Performance Server, and Teradata.

See also IBM Linux Solution Optimizes Enterprise Data Warehousing.
