= BRINP1 =

Protein-coding gene in the species Homo sapiens

Identifiers
- Aliases: BRINP1, DBC1, DBCCR1, FAM5A, BMP/retinoic acid inducible neural specific 1
- External IDs: OMIM: 602865; MGI: 1928478; HomoloGene: 8754; GeneCards: BRINP1; OMA:BRINP1 - orthologs

Gene location (Human)
Chr.	Chromosome 9 (human)
Band	9q33.1	Start	119,153,458 bp
Band	9q33.1	End	119,369,435 bp

Gene location (Mouse)
Chr.	Chromosome 4 (mouse)
Band	4|4 C1	Start	68,679,751 bp
Band	4|4 C1	End	68,872,634 bp
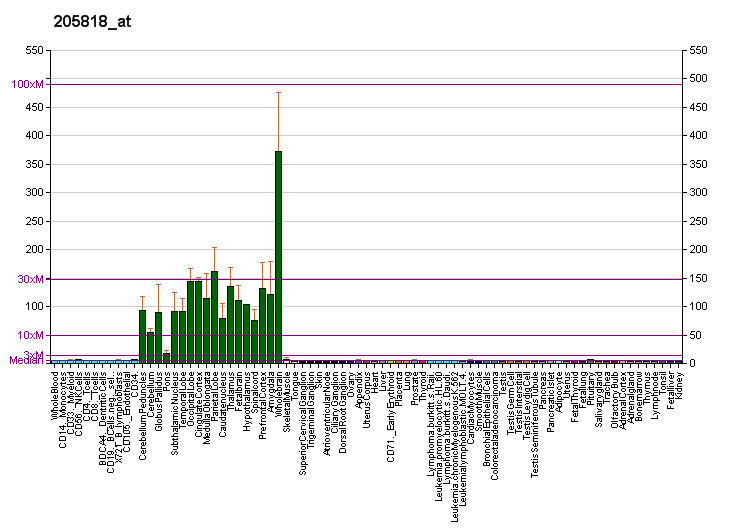
RNA expression pattern
Bgee	Human / Mouse (ortholog); Top expressed in: middle temporal gyrus; Brodmann area 23; entorhinal cortex; primary visual cortex; postcentral gyrus; superior frontal gyrus; Brodmann area 46; prefrontal cortex; frontal pole; buccal mucosa cell / Top expressed in: visual cortex; primary visual cortex; superior frontal gyrus; dentate gyrus of hippocampal formation granule cell; hippocampus proper; piriform cortex; prefrontal cortex; primary motor cortex; subdivision of hippocampus; dorsal striatum; More reference expression data
BioGPS	More reference expression data
Gene ontology
Molecular function	protein binding
Cellular component	cytoplasm; soma; dendrite; endoplasmic reticulum
Biological process	cell cycle; negative regulation of cell cycle; cell death; behavioral fear response; positive regulation of neuron differentiation; negative regulation of neurogenesis; social behavior; cellular response to retinoic acid; negative regulation of mitotic cell cycle; short-term memory; exploration behavior; Maternal behavior; vocalization behavior
Sources:Amigo / QuickGO
Orthologs
Species	Human	Mouse
Entrez	1620	56710
Ensembl	ENSG00000078725	ENSMUSG00000028351
UniProt	O60477	Q920P3
RefSeq (mRNA)	NM_014618	NM_019967
RefSeq (protein)	NP_055433	NP_064351
Location (UCSC)	Chr 9: 119.15 – 119.37 Mb	Chr 4: 68.68 – 68.87 Mb
PubMed search
- Wikidata
View/Edit Human	View/Edit Mouse

BMP/retinoic acid-inducible neural-specific protein 1, also known as deleted in bladder cancer protein 1 (DBC1) is a protein that in humans is encoded by the BRINP1 gene.

This gene is located within chromosome 9 (9q32-33), a chromosomal region that frequently shows loss of heterozygosity in transitional cell carcinoma of the bladder. It contains a 5' CpG island that may be a frequent target of hypermethylation, and it may undergo hypermethylation-based silencing in some bladder cancers.

The functions of this gene are unknown, and it has not yet been placed in a protein family or functional pathway. Nonetheless, it is suspected to act as a tumor suppressor gene.
