= CCAR2 =

Protein-coding gene in the species Homo sapiens

Identifiers
- Aliases: CCAR2, DBC-1, DBC1, KIAA1967, NET35, p30 DBC, p30DBC, cell cycle and apoptosis regulator 2
- External IDs: OMIM: 607359; MGI: 2444228; GeneCards: CCAR2

Gene location (Human)
Chr.	Chromosome 8 (human)
Band	8p21.3	Start	22,604,757 bp
Band	8p21.3	End	22,620,964 bp

Gene location (Mouse)
Chr.	Chromosome 14 (mouse)
Band	14|14 D2	Start	70,375,613 bp
Band	14|14 D2	End	70,391,260 bp
RNA expression pattern
Bgee	Human / Mouse (ortholog); Top expressed in: ventricular zone; ganglionic eminence; right uterine tube; right testis; left testis; granulocyte; skin of leg; cerebellar hemisphere; right hemisphere of cerebellum; appendix / Top expressed in: ventricular zone; spermatocyte; neural layer of retina; dentate gyrus of hippocampal formation granule cell; renal corpuscle; medullary collecting duct; neural tube; ganglionic eminence; superior frontal gyrus; primary visual cortex; More reference expression data
BioGPS	n/a
Gene ontology
Molecular function	RNA polymerase II complex binding; enzyme inhibitor activity; protein binding; enzyme binding; RNA binding; nuclear receptor coactivator activity
Cellular component	cytoplasm; nucleoplasm; DBIRD complex; mitochondrial matrix; spliceosomal complex; nucleus
Biological process	mitochondrial fragmentation involved in apoptotic process; negative regulation of catalytic activity; regulation of transcription, DNA-templated; regulation of protein stability; positive regulation of DNA damage checkpoint; rhythmic process; positive regulation of canonical Wnt signaling pathway; mRNA processing; regulation of DNA-templated transcription, elongation; regulation of protein deacetylation; negative regulation of intrinsic apoptotic signaling pathway in response to DNA damage; Wnt signaling pathway; transcription, DNA-templated; cellular response to DNA damage stimulus; regulation of circadian rhythm; negative regulation of cell growth; RNA splicing; negative regulation of proteasomal ubiquitin-dependent protein catabolic process; positive regulation of apoptotic process; regulation of cellular response to heat; cell cycle; negative regulation of transcription, DNA-templated; response to UV; apoptotic process; positive regulation of nucleic acid-templated transcription
Sources:Amigo / QuickGO
Orthologs
Databases	NCBI: entry; OMA: entry
Species	Human	Mouse
Entrez	57805	219158
Ensembl	ENSG00000158941	ENSMUSG00000033712
UniProt	Q8N163	Q8VDP4
RefSeq (mRNA)	NM_021174; NM_199205; NM_001363068; NM_001363069; NM_001393997	NM_146055
RefSeq (protein)	NP_066997; NP_001349997; NP_001349998	NP_666167
Location (UCSC)	Chr 8: 22.6 – 22.62 Mb	Chr 14: 70.38 – 70.39 Mb
PubMed search
- Wikidata
View/Edit Human	View/Edit Mouse

Cell cycle and apoptosis regulator protein 2, also known as Deleted in breast cancer 1 (DBC-1), and KIAA1967, is a protein which in humans is encoded by the CCAR2 gene.

== Function ==
Recent studies show that DBC1 is an inhibitor of the sirtuin-type deacetylase, SIRT1, which deacetylates histones and p53. DBC1 is likely to regulate the activity of SIRT1 or related deacetylases by sensing the soluble products or substrates of the NAD-dependent deacetylation reaction.
