= DBC/1012 =

Computer produced by Teradata Corporation

The DBC/1012 Data Base Computer was a database machine introduced by Teradata Corporation in 1984, as a back-end data base management system for mainframe computers. The DBC/1012 harnessed multiple Intel microprocessors, each with its own dedicated disk drive, by interconnecting them with the Ynet switching network in a massively parallel processing system. The DBC/1012 was designed to manage databases up to one terabyte (1,000,000,000,000 characters) in size; "1012" in the name refers to "10 to the power of 12".

Image of Teradata DBC/1012 from its 1987 brochure

Major components included:

- Mainframe-resident software to manage users and transfer data
- Interface processor (IFP) - the hardware connection between the mainframe and the DBC/1012
- Ynet - a custom-built system interconnect that supported broadcast and sorting
- Access module processor (AMP) - the unit of parallelism: includes microprocessor, disk drive, file system, and database software
- System console and printer
- TEQUEL (TEradata QUEry Language) - an extension of SQL

The DBC/1012 was designed to scale up to 1024 Ynet interconnected processor-disk units. Rows of a relation (table) were distributed by hashing on the primary database index.

The DBC/1012 used a 474 megabyte Winchester disk drive with an average seek time of 18 milliseconds. The disk drive was capable of transferring data at 1.9 MB/s although in practice the sustainable data rate was lower because the IO pattern tended towards random access and transfer lengths of 8 to 12 kilobytes.

The processor cabinet was 60 inches high and 27 inches wide, weighed 450 pounds, and held up to 8 microprocessor units. The storage cabinet was 60 inches high and 27 inches wide, weighed 625 pounds, and held up to 4 disk storage units.

The DBC/1012 preceded the advent of redundant array of independent disks (RAID) technology, so data protection was provided by the "fallback" feature, which kept a logical copy of rows of a relation on different AMPs. The collection of AMPs that provided this protection for each other was called a cluster. A cluster could have from 2 to 16 AMPs.

The product could be integrated with optical disc drives. There were at least four models, marketed through about 1993.
