= Michael F. Koehler =

American technology executive

- Occupation: former Teradata company Chief Executive Officer

Michael F. Koehler is an American technology executive who was the chief executive officer of Teradata from September 2007 to May 2016.

== Education ==
Koehler graduated from the University of Delaware’s College of Business and Economics in 1975 with a bachelor's degree in business administration. He is a member of Sigma Phi Epsilon.

== Career ==
Koehler started his career with NCR Corporation in 1975, rising to be vice president. From 2000 to 2003, he was vice president of the Teradata division of NCR's global field operations. In 2003, he became senior vice president of the Teradata division of NCR. Koehler became president and CEO of Teradata after its 2007 spin off from NCR.

Koehler was succeeded as CEO by Victor L. Lund.
