= Britton Lee =

American relational database company

Britton Lee Inc. (renamed ShareBase Corp.)
- (Also need BL logo)
- Type: Public
- Industry: Database management systems
- Founded: 1979
- Headquarters: Los Gatos, California, United States
- Number of employees: ≈200

Britton Lee Inc. was a pioneering relational database company. Renamed ShareBase, it was acquired by Teradata in June, 1990.

== History ==
Britton Lee was founded in 1979 by David L. Britton, Geoffrey M. Lee, and a group of hardware engineers along with Robert Epstein, Michael Ubell and Paula Hawthorn from the research team that created Ingres. The company sold database machines, specialized computers designed for database software. As of 1985 it had an installed base of about 300, primarily for midrange systems such as DEC VAX.

Epstein later left Britton Lee to help found Sybase. Britton and Lee left the company in 1987. On May 15, 1989, the company formally changed its name to ShareBase Corporation.

After layoffs and financial losses in 1989, ShareBase was acquired by Teradata in June, 1990. Teradata was, like Britton-Lee, an early database machine vendor.

== Products ==
As of fall, 1989:

- ShareBase II: An RDBMS designed for a client/server environment.
- ShareBase I: Predecessor to ShareBase II
- ShareBase SQL Database Server, various models:
  - Server/8000: "Upper-mid-range database server" that supported ShareBase II. Optimized database operations on a RISC/ECL database processor. Used a "distributed function multiprocessor architecture" and included up to 256 MB of "shared high-speed data memory." Supported a variety of clients, including IBM PC DOS, Apple Macintosh, Sun, AT&T 3B series computers systems, Pyramid, DEC VAX, HP 3000 and HP 9000, and IBM VM/CMS and MVS.
  - Server/300 supported ShareBase I and worked with a variety of clients, including PC/DOS, UNIX workstations, AT&T System V, Sun, and DEC VAX with BSD/UNIX, VAX/VMS, or ULTRIX. It also supported up to 50 databases, 32,000 tables per database, 2 billion rows per table, 4 MB of memory, and 200 concurrent users.
  - Server/700 supported ShareBase I, same basic features as the Server/300, but with 6 MB of memory and "greater performance for more demanding environments".
- ShareCom: Communications facilities between database clients and the ShareBase servers.

The Server/300 came in three models:

- Model 25: 600 MB of disk storage and one tape drive
- Model 35: 1200 MB of disk storage and two tape drives
- Model 60: 3320 MB of disk storage and two tape drives

=== Affiliation with Omnibase/SmartStar ===
An announcement was made in 1984, that Britton-Lee's database machine IDM (Intelligent Database Machine) was being sold together with Signal Technology Inc.'s Omnibase and SmartStar relational database software.

This hardware/software combination of Omnibase/Smartstar/Britton Lee Data Base Machine(s), was used by NASA, USMC and by financial services for analysis.

SmartStar is Signal Technology Inc (STI)'s application development environment for the VAX, and it supports several databases using native connections:

RMS, Rdb/VMS, Oracle, Sybase, Ingres, Teradata/ShareBase.

Although before SQL became standard STI's focus was on IQL (Interactive Query Language), now the query language it supports is SQL.

Components include

- SmartBuilder
- SmartDesign
- SmartStation
- SmartGL
- SmartCall and RSQL (for use from 3GL languages)
- SmartQuery
- SmartMove (mass load/unload)
- SmartReport
- SmartPainter
- ISQL (Interactive SQL)

==== Signal Technology Inc ====
As the above combination moved along, STI and Britton-Lee saw a validation in the form of a review, which confirmed: "there exists no database management system that matches the performance of the IDM with OMNIBASE."
