= Delivery Bar Code Sorter =

Mail sorting machine used by the US Postal Service

A Delivery Bar Code Sorter (DBCS) is a mail sorting machine used primarily by the United States Postal Service. Introduced in 1990, these machines sort letters at a rate of approximately 36,000 pieces per hour, with a 99% accuracy rate. A computer scans the addresses of the mail, and sorts it to one of up to 302 pockets, setting it up for delivery by the letter carrier.
