= Aprimo =

Global marketing automation software company

Coordinates: 41.880960°N 87.634809°W

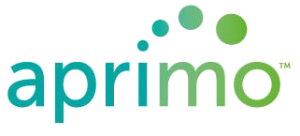
- Type: Private
- Industry: Software
- Founded: 1998; 28 years ago in Indianapolis
- Headquarters: Chicago, Illinois, United States
- Area served: Worldwide
- Key people: John Stammen (Chief Executive Officer); Mike Nelson (Chief Financial Officer); Kevin Souers (Chief Product Officer); Ed Breault (Chief Marketing Officer)
- Owner: Marlin Equity Partners
- Number of employees: 500 (2016)
- Website: Official website

Aprimo (/æ,primo/) is a United States–based company that develops and sells marketing automation software and digital asset management (DAM) technology for marketing and customer experience departments in enterprise organizations. Its software is designed to help manage the behind-the-scenes activities involved in marketing.

== History ==
=== Early history ===
Aprimo was founded in Indianapolis in 1998 by former executives of Software Artistry, which had recently been purchased by IBM. There are suggestions that it was the first supplier of Marketing resource management (MRM) software, it is certainly the case that it was one of the earliest providers. In 2004, it made its first acquisition, buying British software developer Then. The following year, 2005, saw Aprimo acquire the EMS business of DoubleClick together with about 70 customers before the remainder of that organisation went to Hellman & Friedman. By 2007, Aprimo had about 250 employees and its clients included Bank of America, Nestlé, Warner Bros., and Toyota.

=== Teradata ===
In 2011, the company was acquired by Teradata in a $525 million transaction.

=== Marlin ===
Teradata sold Aprimo in 2016 to Marlin Equity Partners for $90 million which merged it with Revenew and relocated its headquarters to Chicago. In 2017, Aprimo acquired the Belgian company ADAM Software.

== Products and services ==
The company's products include Digital Asset Management, software for managing videos, images, documents, and other assets; Productivity Management, software for managing ideas, plans, and production workflows; Plan & Spend, a budget planning system; Personalization, which serves the most relevant content for each user's needs with AI-powered tagging; and Productivity to accelerate content creation, creative workflows, and campaign go-live across all channels.

In 2017, according to the company, it moved its products to SaaS-based systems running on the Microsoft Azure cloud computing service.

== Operations ==
Aprimo is headquartered in Chicago, with R&D and customer service operations primarily based in Indianapolis.
