= TACL (programming language) =

Scripting programming language

TACL (Tandem Advanced Command Language)
- Original author: Tandem Computers
- Developer: HPE (Hewlett Packared Enterprise)
- Release: 1970s
- Written in: Tandem Application Language (TAL)
- Operating system: NonStop OS
- Platform: NonStop
- Included with: NonStop OS
- Available in: English
- Type: command language and scripting programming language
- License: Proprietary

TACL (Tandem Advanced Command Language) is the scripting programming language which acts as the shell in Tandem Computers/NonStop computers.

== TACL overview ==
TACL, an interpreted language, is the default scripting language on NonStop systems. HPE later introduced a ksh-based shell command interface, however this does not contain every capability offered by TACL. TACL built-ins reflect the multi-CPU nature of the NonStop Operating System.

TACL instructions can be stored in a simple text file as MACROS, ROUTINES, or DEFINES which the TACL interpreter can execute as scripts. Such scripts are often used to store complex configuration instructions such as start-up and hardware configuration sequences. TACL is also used as a job control language for batch jobs.

The TACL language has a large number of built-in utilities which allow the user to capture and parse output from various system utilities. This allows users to build TACL programs that can monitor system events through the use of filters that monitor the system and application event logs.

Compilers for other languages (including TAL, Java, C, C++, COBOL, SCOBOL, etc.) may be used to support functions in languages other than TACL.

== Example uses of TACL ==
=== A TACL routine saved in the file FILE1 ===
Create the following subroutine in the file FILE1:

?Section HELLO_BERNARD ROUTINE
#OUTPUT Hello BERNARD

How to run the TACL routine:

1. From a TACL prompt type: LOAD / KEEP 1 / FILE1 (this loads the routine into memory)
2. Type: HELLO_BERNARD (this runs the routine)
3. Output will be: Hello BERNARD

=== TACL code in the file FILE1 ===
An alternate strategy is to create a file named FILE1 and add the following two lines:

?TACL ROUTINE
#OUTPUT Hello BERNARD

Execute the routine by naming the file at the TACL prompt:

> RUN FILE1

== See also ==
- NonStop (server computers)
- Tandem Computers
