= HP Neoview =

Data warehouse and business intelligence computer server line

HP Neoview was a data warehouse and business intelligence computer server line based on the Hewlett-Packard NonStop line. It acted as a database server, providing NonStop OS and NonStop SQL, but lacked the transaction processing functionality of the original NonStop systems.

The line was retired, and no longer marketed, as of January 24, 2011.
