= NonStop SQL =

Fault tolerant relational database management system

- Original author: Tandem Computers
- Developer: HPE
- Release: 1987
- Stable release: 4.0
- Operating system: NonStop OS
- Platform: NonStop
- Standard: ANSI standard (NonStop SQL/MX)
- Available in: NonStop COBOL, NonStop SCOBOL, NonStop Java, NonStop C, NonStop C++, Transaction Application Language (TAL), pTAL, epTAL
- Type: DBMS
- License: Proprietary

NonStop SQL is a commercial relational database management system that is designed for fault tolerance and scalability, currently offered by Hewlett Packard Enterprise. The latest version is SQL/MX 4.0.

The product was originally developed by Tandem Computers. Tandem was acquired by Compaq in 1997. Compaq was later acquired by Hewlett-Packard in 2002. When Hewlett-Packard split in 2015 into HP Inc. and Hewlett Packard Enterprise, NonStop SQL and the rest of the NonStop product line went to Hewlett Packard Enterprise.

The product primarily is used for online transaction processing (OLTP) and is tailored for organizations that need high availability and scalability for their database system. Typical users of the product are stock exchanges, telecommunications, POS, and bank ATM networks.

== History ==
NonStop SQL is designed to run effectively on parallel computers, adding functionality for distributed data, distributed execution, and distributed transactions.

First released in 1987, a second version in 1989 added the ability to run queries in parallel, and the product became fairly famous for being one of the few systems that scales almost linearly with the number of processors in the machine: adding a second CPU to an existing NonStop SQL server almost exactly doubled its performance.

The second version added /MP to its name, for Massively Parallel. A third version, NonStop SQL/MX, created a product that was more ANSI SQL compliant than its predecessor. NonStop SQL/MX has shipped on the NonStop platform since 2002, and can access tables created by NonStop SQL/MP, although only "Native SQL/MX tables" offer ANSI compliance and many "Oracle-like" enhancements. The HP Neoview business intelligence platform was built using NonStop SQL as its origins. NonStop SQL/MX is HP's only OLTP database product.

Parts of the Neoview code base were open sourced in 2014 under the name Trafodion, which is now a top-level Apache project.

== See also ==
- List of relational database management systems
- Comparison of relational database management systems
- Enscribe
- NonStop (server computers)
- Tandem Computers
