= Oracle Exadata =

Computing platform specialized to the Oracle Database

- Original author: Oracle Corporation
- Initial release: October 2008; 17 years ago
- Operating system: Oracle Linux
- Platform: Exadata Database Machine, Exadata Database Service, Exadata Cloud@Customer
- License: Commercial
- Website: www.oracle.com/exadata

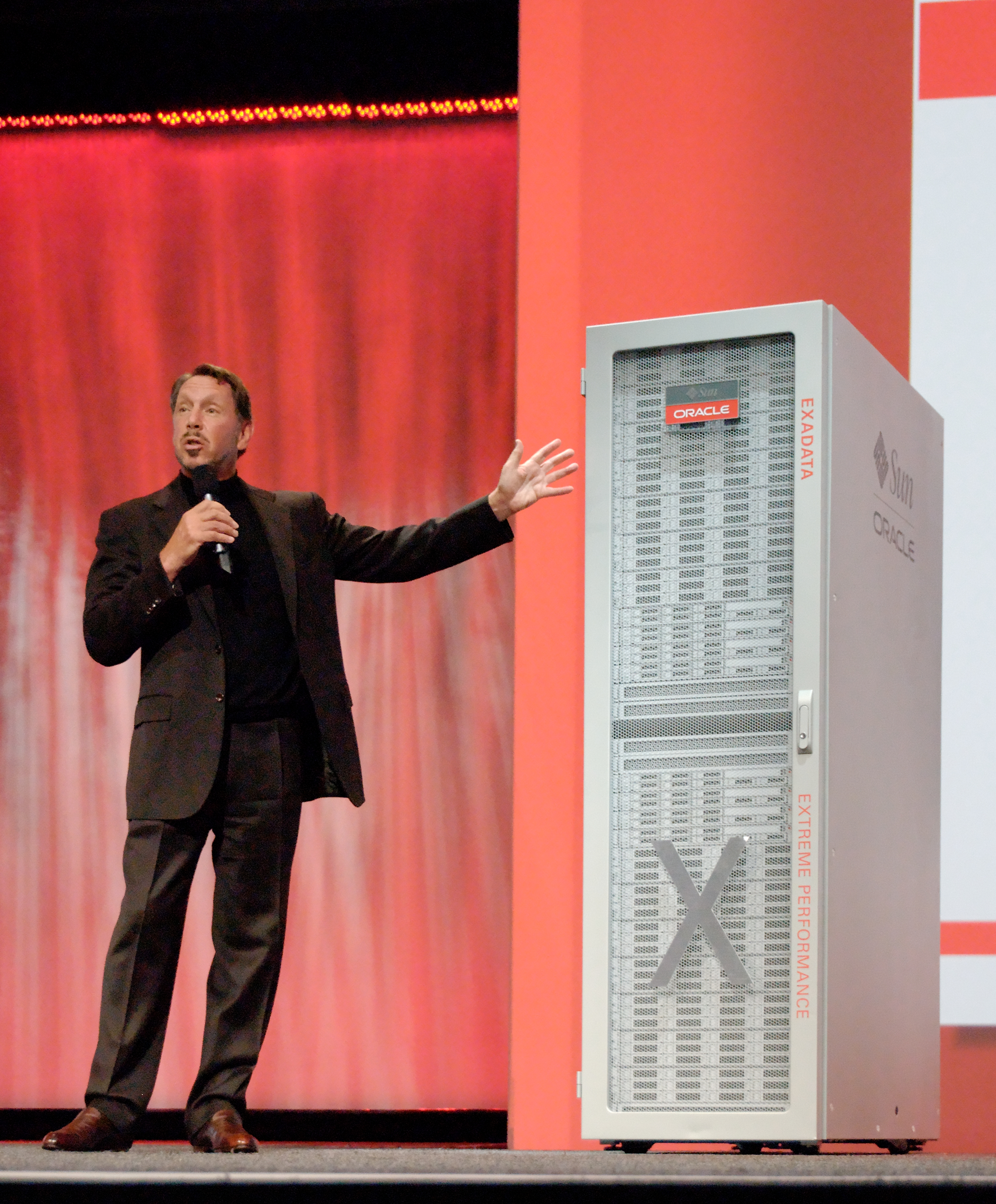
Larry Ellison and Exadata (2009)

Oracle Exadata (Exadata) is a computing system optimized for running Oracle Databases.

Exadata is a combined database machine and software platform that includes scale-out x86-64 compute and storage servers, RoCE networking, RDMA-addressable memory acceleration, NVMe flash, and specialized software.

Exadata was introduced in 2008 for on-premises deployment, and since October 2015, via the Oracle Cloud as a subscription service, known as the Exadata Database Service on Dedicated Infrastructure, and Exadata Database Service on Exascale Infrastructure. Exadata Cloud@Customer is a hybrid cloud (on-premises) deployment of Exadata Database Service.

Starting December, 2023, Exadata Database Service became available for Microsoft Azure, Google and AWS public clouds within the Oracle Database@Azure, Oracle Database@Google Cloud and Oracle Database@AWS multicloud partnerships.

== Use cases ==
Exadata is designed to run all Oracle database workloads, such as online transaction processing, data warehousing, analytics, and AI Vector processing, often with multiple consolidated databases running simultaneously.

Historically, specialized database machines were designed for a particular workload, such as Data Warehousing, and poor or unusable for other workloads, such as online transaction processing. Exadata specializes in mixed workloads sharing system resources with resource management features for prioritization, such as favoring workloads servicing interactive users over reporting and batch. Long running requests, characterized by Data Warehouses, reports, batch jobs and Analytics, are reported to run many times faster compared to a conventional, non-Exadata database server.

== Release history ==
Exadata Release	Primary Software Enhancements	Primary Hardware Enhancements
Database@AWS	Exadata Database Service available with AWS	
X11M - Jan 2025	AI Vector search acceleration - up to 55% faster	25% faster compute core performance
X11M - Jan 2025	Analytics scan throughput increase - 2.2x faster	33% greater server memory bandwidth
X11M - Jan 2025	Transaction processing acceleration - 25% faster	11% faster storage core performance
X11M - Jan 2025	Online transaction processing read latency acceleration - up to 21% faster (14 microseconds)	PCIe 5 performance-optimized flash
X11M - Jan 2025	Intelligent power management - reduce CPU cores, cap power consumption, optimize power utilization	X11M-Z database and storage servers
X11M - Jan 2025	Available on-premises, Oracle Cloud, Cloud@Customer and multicloud (Azure, Google Cloud, AWS)	X11M-XT storage servers for less frequently accessed data. Supports Exascale.
Database@Google Cloud	Exadata Database Service available with Google Cloud	
Exadata Exascale July, 2024	Fully elastic pay-per-use architecture. Users specify the cores and storage capacity needed, reducing entry-level infrastructure costs for Exadata Database Service and aligning costs with usage	None
Exadata Exascale July, 2024	Large pools of shared compute and storage allow databases to quickly scale over time without concern for server-based size limitations or disruptive migrations	None
Exadata Exascale July, 2024	Rapid and efficient database snapshots and thin cloning	None
Database@Azure	Exadata Database Service available with Microsoft Azure	
X10M - June 2023	Exadata RDMA Memory (XRMEM) DRAM cache	3x increase in compute cores (96-core AMD EPYC)
X10M - June 2023	Oracle Linux 8 and UEK 6 kernel updates	1.5x higher memory capacity
X10M - June 2023	New In-Memory Columnar compression algorithm	2.5x faster DDR5 memory
X10M - June 2023	Optimized Smart Scan for more complex queries	2.4x higher flash storage capacity (in all-flash storage)
X10M - June 2023	Faster decryption and decompression	22% more disk storage capacity
X9M - Sept, 2021	Secure RDMA fabric isolation	PCIe 4.0 dual-port active-active 100 Gb RoCE network
X9M - Sept, 2021	Smart Flash Log write-back	33% increase in compute cores
X9M - Sept, 2021	Storage Index and Columnar Cache persistence	33% increase in memory capacity
X9M - Sept, 2021	Faster decryption and decompression Algorithms	28% increase in disk capacity
X9M - Sept, 2021	Smart Scan performance optimizations	1.8x greater internal fabric bandwidth (PCIe 4.0)
X9M - Sept, 2021		1.8x greater flash bandwidth (PCIe 4.0)
X8M - Sept, 2019	RoCE: RDMA over Converged Ethernet	Persistent Memory (PMEM) in storage
X8M - Sept, 2019	Persistent Memory Data Accelerator	100 Gbit/s internal fabric (2.5x increase)
X8M - Sept, 2019	Persistent Memory Commit Accelerator	
X8M - Sept, 2019	KVM virtual machine support	
X8 - April, 2019	AIDE: Advanced Intrusion Detection Environment	Storage Server Extended (XT)
X8 - April, 2019	ML-based monitoring and auto-indexing	40% increase in disk capacity
X8 - April, 2019	Real-time updates of optimizer statistics	60% increase in storage processor cores
X7 - Oct, 2017	In-memory database in flash storage	2x increase in flash capacity
X7 - Oct, 2017	DRAM cache in storage	25% increase in disk capacity
X7 - Oct, 2017	Large-scale storage software updates	25 Gbit/s data center Ethernet support
Exadata Cloud@Customer	Exadata Cloud Service on-premises	
X6 - April, 2016	Exafusion direct-to-wire online transaction processing protocol	2x increase in flash capacity
X6 - April, 2016	Smart Fusion Block Transfer	10% increase in compute cores
X6 - April, 2016	Smart Flash Log	2x increase in memory capacity
Exadata Database Service	Exadata on Oracle Cloud Infrastructure (OCI)	
X5 - Dec, 2014	In-memory database fault tolerance	2x increase in flash & disk capacity
X5 - Dec, 2014	Database snapshots	Elastic configurations
X5 - Dec, 2014	Xen virtual machine support	All-flash storage server option
X5 - Dec, 2014	NVMe flash protocol support	50% increase in compute cores
X5 - Dec, 2014	IPv6 support	50% increase in memory capacity
X4 - Nov, 2013	Network Resource Management	2x increase in flash capacity
X4 - Nov, 2013	I/O latency capping	2x increase in memory capacity
X4 - Nov, 2013	Capacity-on-Demand licensing	50% increase in compute cores
X4 - Nov, 2013	Active/Active InfiniBand (2x increase)	33% increase in disk capacity
X3 - Sept, 2013	Smart Flash Cache write-back	Eighth-Rack configuration
X3 - Sept, 2013	Improved management of slow disks/flash	4x increase in flash capacity
X3 - Sept, 2013	Sub-second brownout after storage failure	33% increase in compute cores
X3 - Sept, 2013	Simplified disk replacement	75% increase in memory capacity
X3 - Sept, 2013	Bypass predictive disk failure	2x increase in data center bandwidth
X2 - Sept, 2010	Smart Flash Log	8-socket (X2-8) configuration
X2 - Sept, 2010	Auto Service Request	Storage Expansion Rack
X2 - Sept, 2010	Secure Erase of storage	Hardware-based decryption
X2 - Sept, 2010	Platinum Services	50% increase in compute cores
X2 - Sept, 2010		2x increase in memory capacity
X2 - Sept, 2010		50% increase in disk capacity
X2 - Sept, 2010		8x increase in data center bandwidth
v2 - Sept, 2009	Storage Indexes	Flash storage
v2 - Sept, 2009	Database-aware Smart Flash Cache	Quarter-Rack configuration
v2 - Sept, 2009	Hybrid Columnar Compression	2x increase in memory & disk capacity
v2 - Sept, 2009		3x increase in data center bandwidth
v2 - Sept, 2009		40 Gbit/s internal fabric (2x increase)
v1 - Sept, 2008	Oracle Enterprise Linux	Scale-out 4-socket compute servers
v1 - Sept, 2008	Smart Scan (storage offload)	Scale-out 4-socket storage servers
v1 - Sept, 2008	IORM (I/O Resource Manager)	20 Gbit/s internal fabric (InfiniBand)
v1 - Sept, 2008	Join filtering (Bloom filters)	1 Terabyte disks
v1 - Sept, 2008	Incremental backup filtering	1 Gbit/s data center network (Ethernet)
v1 - Sept, 2008	Smart file creation	

== Support policy ==
As the platform has been around since 2008, Oracle has published information related to the end-of-support for older Exadata generations. In Oracle's published document titled Oracle Hardware and Systems Support Policies, they mention "After five years from last ship date, replacement parts may not be available and/or the response times for sending replacement parts may be delayed." To look up the "last ship date" of a particular Oracle Exadata generation, Oracle published a document titled Oracle Exadata - A guide for decision makers.

Each generation of the Oracle Zero Data Loss Recovery Appliance shares components with similar generations of Exadata.
