= Robert S. Swarz =

Robert S. Swarz is the former co-director of the Systems Engineering Practice Office of MITRE Corporation and currently Professor of Practice in the systems engineering program at Worcester Polytechnic Institute, where he has been teaching for over 30 years and held the post of Chair of the Systems Engineering Advisory Council. He is a co-author of a classic text in computer reliability and fault-tolerant systems.

Earlier, he was a researcher at Digital Equipment Corporation, where he was in charge of the reliability and maintainability program. He is also Assistant Director for Processes for the International Council on Systems Engineering and member of the Steering Council for Dependable Systems and Networks of the IEEE, where he is a Life Member.

He holds B.S. and Ph.D. degrees from New York University, an M.B.A. from Boston University, and an M.S. from Rensselaer Polytechnic Institute.

== Books ==
- Daniel P. Siewiorek, Robert S. Swarz, Reliable Computer Systems: Design and Evaluation, CRC Press, Third Edition, 1998, ISBN 156881092X
- Robert S. Swarz, Philip Koopman, Michel Cukier (Eds.): IEEE/IFIP International Conference on Dependable Systems and Networks, DSN 2012, Boston, MA, USA, June 25–28, 2012. IEEE Computer Society 2012, ISBN 978-1-4673-1624-8
