= Teradata =

American software company

Teradata Corporation
- Type: Public
- Traded as: NYSE: TDC; S&P 600 component
- Industry: Software
- Founded: 1979; 47 years ago
- Headquarters: San Diego, California, U.S.
- Key people: Steve McMillan (CEO)
- Products: Data warehousing tools Analytics tools Big data tools
- Services: SaaS
- Revenue: ▼US$1.75 billion (2024)
- Operating income: ▲US$209 million (2024)
- Net income: ▲US$114 million (2024)
- Total assets: ▼US$1.70 billion (2024)
- Total equity: ▼US$133 million (2024)
- Number of employees: c. 5,700 (Dec 2024)
- Website: www.teradata.com

Teradata Corporation is an American software company that provides cloud database and analytics-related software, products, and services. The company was formed in 1979 in Brentwood, California, as a collaboration between researchers at Caltech and Citibank's advanced technology group.

== Overview ==
Teradata is an enterprise software company that develops and sells database analytics software. The company provides three main services: business analytics, cloud products, and consulting. It operates in North and Latin America, Europe, the Middle East, Africa, and Asia.

Teradata is headquartered in San Diego, California, and has additional major U.S. locations in Atlanta and San Francisco, where its data center research and development is housed. It is publicly traded on the New York Stock Exchange (NYSE) under the stock symbol TDC. Steve McMillan has served as the company's president and chief executive officer since 2020. The company reported $1.836 billion in revenue, a net income of $129 million, and 8,535 employees globally, as of February 9, 2020.

== History ==
The concept of Teradata grew from research at the California Institute of Technology and from the discussions of Citibank's advanced technology group in the 1970s. In 1979, the company was incorporated in Brentwood, California, by Jack E. Shemer, Philip M. Neches, Walter E. Muir, Jerold R. Modes, William P. Worth, Carroll Reed and David Hartke. Teradata released its DBC/1012 database machine in 1984, with Citibank as an early customer. In 1990, the company acquired Sharebase, originally named Britton Lee, another early database machine vendor that, unlike Teradata's IBM mainframe focus, primarily served midrange systems. In September 1991, AT&T Corporation acquired NCR Corporation, which announced the acquisition of Teradata for about $250 million in December. Teradata built the first system over 1 terabyte for Wal-Mart in 1992.

NCR acquired Strategic Technologies & Systems in 1999 and appointed Stephen Brobst as chief technology officer of Teradata Solutions Group. In 2000, NCR acquired Ceres Integrated Solutions and its customer relationship management software for $90 million, as well as Stirling Douglas Group and its demand chain management software. Teradata acquired financial management software from DecisionPoint in 2005. In January 2007, NCR announced Teradata would become an independent public company, led by Michael F. Koehler. The new company's shares started trading in October.

In April 2016, a hardware product line called IntelliFlex was announced. Victor L. Lund became the chief executive on May 5, 2016.

In October 2018, Teradata started promoting its cloud analytics software called Vantage (which evolved from the Teradata Database).

On May 7, 2020, Teradata announced the appointment of Steve McMillan as president and chief executive officer, effective June 8, 2020.

In December 2024, Teradata successfully appealed a California federal judge's decision in favor of SAP SE in a case involving allegations of trade secret misappropriation and antitrust violations. The lawsuit accused SAP of using Teradata's trade secrets to address technical issues in its software and of violating antitrust laws by bundling products and requiring customers to purchase them together. A federal appeals court reversed the earlier ruling, reviving Teradata's claims.

=== Acquisitions and divestitures ===
Teradata has acquired several companies since becoming an independent public company in 2008. In March 2008, Teradata acquired professional services company Claraview, which previously had spun out software provider Clarabridge. Teradata acquired column-oriented DBMS vendor Kickfire in August 2010, followed by the marketing software company Aprimo for about $550 million in December. In March 2011, the company acquired Aster Data Systems for about $263 million. Teradata acquired Software-as-a-service digital marketing company eCircle in May 2012, which was merged into the Aprimo business.

In 2014, Teradata acquired the assets of Revelytix, a provider of information management products and for a reported $50 million. In September, Teradata acquired Hadoop service firm Think Big Analytics. In December, Teradata acquired RainStor, a company specializing in online data archiving on Hadoop. Teradata acquired Appoxxee, a mobile marketing software as a service provider, for about $20 million in January 2015, followed by the Netherlands-based digital marketing company FLXone in September. That same year Teradata acquired a small Business Intelligence firm, MiaPearl.

In July 2016, the marketing applications division, using the Aprimo brand, was sold to private equity firm Marlin Equity Partners for about $90 million with Aprimo under CEO John Stammen moving its headquarters to Chicago. while absorbing Revenew Inc. that Marlin had also bought.

Teradata acquired Big Data Partnership, a service company based in the UK, on July 21, 2016. In July 2017, Teradata acquired StackIQ, maker of the Stacki cluster manager software.

In 2023, Teradata acquired Stemma, a data catalog software provider.

== Technology and products ==
Teradata offers three primary services to its customers: cloud and hardware-based data warehousing, business analytics, and consulting services. In September 2016, the company launched Teradata Everywhere, which allows users to submit queries against public and private databases. The service uses massively parallel processing across both its physical data warehouse and cloud storage, including managed environments such as Amazon Web Services, Microsoft Azure, VMware, and Teradata's Managed Cloud and IntelliFlex. Teradata offers customers both hybrid cloud and multi-cloud storage. In March 2017, Teradata introduced Teradata IntelliCloud, a secure managed cloud for data and analytic software as a service. IntelliCloud is compatible with Teradata's data warehouse platform, IntelliFlex. The Teradata Analytics Platform was unveiled in 2017.

In July 2025, Teradata introduced ModelOps, updating its ClearScape Analytics to streamline agentic AI and generative AI applications.

=== Big data ===
Teradata began to use the term "big data" in 2010. CTO Stephen Brobst attributed the rise of big data to "new media sources, such as social media." The increase in semi-structured and unstructured data gathered from online interactions prompted Teradata to form the "Petabyte club" in 2011 for its heaviest big data users.

The rise of big data resulted in many traditional data warehousing companies updating their products and technology. For Teradata, big data prompted the acquisition of Aster Data Systems in 2011 for the company's MapReduce capabilities and ability to store and analyze semi-structured data.

=== Old hardware line end of support ===
To focus on its cloud database and analytics software business, Teradata plans to end support for its old hardware platforms; Teradata will provide remedial maintenance services for six years from its Platform Sales Discontinuation Date. Platform Support Discontinuation is the end of the support date for a particular Teradata hardware platform. Teradata hardware platforms saw support discontinuation start in 2017, with the 2580 generation of its data warehouse appliance, with only its IntelliFlex 2.5 and R740 hardware platforms being listed as "current product". All other platform models/classes have a published support discontinuation date. Teradata customers may request extended support for a Teradata platform that has reached its end of support life. The extended support for a platform requires approval from the local Area Director and will be delivered on a "best effort" basis, as spare parts for older platforms may no longer be available.

=== Teradata Vantage analytics ===
In October 2018, Teradata started calling their cloud analytics software product line Vantage. Vantage is composed of various analytics engines on a core relational database, including the Aster graph database and a machine learning engine. The capability to leverage open-source analytic engines such as Spark and TensorFlow was released. Vantage can be deployed across public clouds, on-premises, and commodity infrastructure. Vantage provides storage and analysis for multi-structured data formats.
