= SQLSTATE =

Return code in the SQL standard

Programs calling a database that conforms to the SQL standard receive an indication of the success or failure of the call. This return code - which is called SQLSTATE - consists of 5 bytes. They are divided into two parts: the first and second bytes contain a class and the following three a subclass. Each class belongs to one of four categories: "S" denotes "Success" (class 00), "W" denotes "Warning" (class 01), "N" denotes "No data" (class 02), and "X" denotes "Exception" (all other classes).

- Real DBMSs are free to define additional values for SQLSTATE to handle those features that are beyond the standard. Such values must use one of the characters [I-Z] or [5-9] as the first byte of class (first byte of SQLSTATE) or subclass (third byte of SQLSTATE).
- In addition to SQLSTATE, the SQL command GET DIAGNOSTICS offers more details about the last executed SQL command.
- In very early versions of the SQL standard, the return code was called SQLCODE and used a different coding schema.

The following table lists the standard-conforming values - based on SQL:2011. The table's last column shows the part of the standard that defines the row. If it is empty, the definition originates from part 2 Foundation.

SQLSTATE	Cat.	Class	Class Text	Subclass	Subclass Text	SQL part
00000	S	00	successful completion	000	(no subclass)	
01000	W	01	warning	000	(no subclass)	
01001	W	01	warning	001	cursor operation conflict	
01002	W	01	warning	002	disconnect error	
01003	W	01	warning	003	null value eliminated in set function	
01004	W	01	warning	004	string data, right truncation	
01005	W	01	warning	005	insufficient item descriptor areas	
01006	W	01	warning	006	privilege not revoked	
01007	W	01	warning	007	privilege not granted	
01009	W	01	warning	009	search condition too long for information schema	
0100A	W	01	warning	00A	query expression too long for information schema	
0100B	W	01	warning	00B	default value too long for information schema	
0100C	W	01	warning	00C	result sets returned	
0100D	W	01	warning	00D	additional result sets returned	
0100E	W	01	warning	00E	attempt to return too many result sets	
0100F	W	01	warning	00F	statement too long for information schema	
01010	W	01	warning	010	column cannot be mapped	SQL/XML
01011	W	01	warning	011	SQL-Java path too long for information schema	SQL/JRT
01012	W	01	warning	012	invalid number of conditions	
0102F	W	01	warning	02F	array data, right truncation	
02000	N	02	no data	000	(no subclass)	
02001	N	02	no data	001	no additional result sets returned	
07000	X	07	dynamic SQL error	000	(no subclass)	
07001	X	07	dynamic SQL error	001	using clause does not match dynamic parameter specifications	
07002	X	07	dynamic SQL error	002	using clause does not match target specifications	
07003	X	07	dynamic SQL error	003	cursor specification cannot be executed	
07004	X	07	dynamic SQL error	004	using clause required for dynamic parameters	
07005	X	07	dynamic SQL error	005	prepared statement not a cursor specification	
07006	X	07	dynamic SQL error	006	restricted data type attribute violation	
07007	X	07	dynamic SQL error	007	using clause required for result fields	
07008	X	07	dynamic SQL error	008	invalid descriptor count	
07009	X	07	dynamic SQL error	009	invalid descriptor index	
0700B	X	07	dynamic SQL error	00B	data type transform function violation	
0700C	X	07	dynamic SQL error	00C	undefined DATA value	
0700D	X	07	dynamic SQL error	00D	invalid DATA target	
0700E	X	07	dynamic SQL error	00E	invalid LEVEL value	
0700F	X	07	dynamic SQL error	00F	invalid DATETIME_INTERVAL_CODE	
08000	X	08	connection exception	000	(no subclass)	
08001	X	08	connection exception	001	SQL-client unable to establish SQL-connection	
08002	X	08	connection exception	002	connection name in use	
08003	X	08	connection exception	003	connection does not exist	
08004	X	08	connection exception	004	SQL-server rejected establishment of SQL-connection	
08006	X	08	connection exception	006	connection failure	
08007	X	08	connection exception	007	transaction resolution unknown	
09000	X	09	triggered action exception	000	(no subclass)	
0A000	X	0A	feature not supported	000	(no subclass)	
0A001	X	0A	feature not supported	001	multiple server transactions	
0D000	X	0D	invalid target type specification	000	(no subclass)	
0E000	X	0E	invalid schema name list specification	000	(no subclass)	
0F000	X	0F	locator exception	000	(no subclass)	
0F001	X	0F	locator exception	001	invalid specification	
0K000	X	0K	resignal when handler not active	000	(no subclass)	SQL/PSM
0L000	X	0L	invalid grantor	000	(no subclass)	
0M000	X	0M	invalid SQL-invoked procedure reference	000	(no subclass)	
0N000	X	0N	SQL/XML mapping error	000	(no subclass)	SQL/XML
0N001	X	0N	SQL/XML mapping error	001	unmappable XML name	SQL/XML
0N002	X	0N	SQL/XML mapping error	002	invalid XML character	SQL/XML
0P000	X	0P	invalid role specification	000	(no subclass)	
0S000	X	0S	invalid transform group name specification	000	(no subclass)	
0T000	X	0T	target table disagrees with cursor specification	000	(no subclass)	
0U000	X	0U	attempt to assign to non-updatable column	000	(no subclass)	
0V000	X	0V	attempt to assign to ordering column	000	(no subclass)	
0W000	X	0W	prohibited statement encountered during trigger execution	000	(no subclass)	
0W001	X	0W	prohibited statement encountered during trigger execution	001	modify table modified by data change delta table	
0X000	X	0X	invalid foreign server specification	000	(no subclass)	SQL/MED
0Y000	X	0Y	pass-through specific condition	000	(no subclass)	SQL/MED
0Y001	X	0Y	pass-through specific condition	001	invalid cursor option	SQL/MED
0Y002	X	0Y	pass-through specific condition	002	invalid cursor allocation	SQL/MED
0Z000	X	0Z	diagnostics exception	000	(no subclass)	
0Z001	X	0Z	diagnostics exception	001	maximum number of stacked diagnostics areas exceeded	
0Z002	X	0Z	diagnostics exception	002	stacked diagnostics accessed without active handler	SQL/PSM
10000	X	10	XQuery error	000	(no subclass)	SQL/XML
20000	X	20	case not found for case statement	000	(no subclass)	SQL/PSM
21000	X	21	cardinality violation	000	(no subclass)	
22000	X	22	data exception	000	(no subclass)	
22001	X	22	data exception	001	string data, right truncation	
22002	X	22	data exception	002	null value, no indicator parameter	
22003	X	22	data exception	003	numeric value out of range	
22004	X	22	data exception	004	null value not allowed	
22005	X	22	data exception	005	error in assignment	
22006	X	22	data exception	006	invalid interval format	
22007	X	22	data exception	007	invalid datetime format	
22008	X	22	data exception	008	datetime field overflow	
22009	X	22	data exception	009	invalid time zone displacement value	
2200B	X	22	data exception	00B	escape character conflict	
2200C	X	22	data exception	00C	invalid use of escape character	
2200D	X	22	data exception	00D	invalid escape octet	
2200E	X	22	data exception	00E	null value in array target	
2200F	X	22	data exception	00F	zero-length character string	
2200G	X	22	data exception	00G	most specific type mismatch	
2200H	X	22	data exception	00H	sequence generator limit exceeded	
2200J	X	22	data exception	00J	nonidentical notations with the same name	SQL/XML
2200K	X	22	data exception	00K	nonidentical unparsed entities with the same name	SQL/XML
2200L	X	22	data exception	00L	not an XML document	SQL/XML
2200M	X	22	data exception	00M	invalid XML document	SQL/XML
2200N	X	22	data exception	00N	invalid XML content	SQL/XML
2200P	X	22	data exception	00P	interval value out of range	
2200Q	X	22	data exception	00Q	multiset value overflow	
2200R	X	22	data exception	00R	XML value overflow	SQL/XML
2200S	X	22	data exception	00S	invalid comment	SQL/XML
2200T	X	22	data exception	00T	invalid processing instruction	SQL/XML
2200U	X	22	data exception	00U	not an XQuery document node	SQL/XML
2200V	X	22	data exception	00V	invalid XQuery context item	SQL/XML
2200W	X	22	data exception	00W	XQuery serialization error	SQL/XML
22010	X	22	data exception	010	invalid indicator parameter value	
22011	X	22	data exception	011	substring error	
22012	X	22	data exception	012	division by zero	
22013	X	22	data exception	013	invalid preceding or following size in window function	
22014	X	22	data exception	014	invalid argument for NTILE function	
22015	X	22	data exception	015	interval field overflow	
22016	X	22	data exception	016	invalid argument for NTH_VALUE function	
22017	X	22	data exception	017	invalid data specified for datalink	SQL/MED
22018	X	22	data exception	018	invalid character value for cast	
22019	X	22	data exception	019	invalid escape character	
2201A	X	22	data exception	01A	null argument passed to datalink constructor	SQL/MED
2201B	X	22	data exception	01B	invalid regular expression	
2201C	X	22	data exception	01C	null row not permitted in table	
2201D	X	22	data exception	01D	datalink value exceeds maximum length	SQL/MED
2201E	X	22	data exception	01E	invalid argument for natural logarithm	
2201F	X	22	data exception	01F	invalid argument for power function	
2201G	X	22	data exception	01G	invalid argument for width bucket function	
2201H	X	22	data exception	01H	invalid row version	
2201J	X	22	data exception	01J	XQuery sequence cannot be validated	SQL/XML
2201K	X	22	data exception	01K	XQuery document node cannot be validated	SQL/XML
2201L	X	22	data exception	01L	no XML schema found	SQL/XML
2201M	X	22	data exception	01M	element namespace not declared	SQL/XML
2201N	X	22	data exception	01N	global element not declared	SQL/XML
2201P	X	22	data exception	01P	no XML element with the specified QName	SQL/XML
2201Q	X	22	data exception	01Q	no XML element with the specified namespace	SQL/XML
2201R	X	22	data exception	01R	validation failure	SQL/XML
2201S	X	22	data exception	01S	invalid Query regular expression	
2201T	X	22	data exception	01T	invalid Query option flag	
2201U	X	22	data exception	01U	attempt to replace a zero-length string	
2201V	X	22	data exception	01V	invalid Query replacement string	
2201W	X	22	data exception	01W	invalid row count in fetch first clause	
2201X	X	22	data exception	01X	invalid row count in result offset clause	
22021	X	22	data exception	021	character not in repertoire	
22022	X	22	data exception	022	indicator overflow	
22023	X	22	data exception	023	invalid parameter value	
22024	X	22	data exception	024	unterminated C string	
22025	X	22	data exception	025	invalid escape sequence	
22026	X	22	data exception	026	string data, length mismatch	
22027	X	22	data exception	027	trim error	
22029	X	22	data exception	029	noncharacter in UCS string	
2202A	X	22	data exception	02A	null value in field reference	SQL/PSM
2202D	X	22	data exception	02D	null value substituted for mutator subject parameter	
2202E	X	22	data exception	02E	array element error	
2202F	X	22	data exception	02F	array data, right truncation	
2202G	X	22	data exception	02G	invalid repeat argument in a sample clause	
2202H	X	22	data exception	02H	invalid sample size	
23000	X	23	integrity constraint violation	000	(no subclass)	
23001	X	23	integrity constraint violation	001	restrict violation	
24000	X	24	invalid cursor state	000	(no subclass)	
25000	X	25	invalid transaction state	000	(no subclass)	
25001	X	25	invalid transaction state	001	active SQL-transaction	
25002	X	25	invalid transaction state	002	branch transaction already active	
25003	X	25	invalid transaction state	003	inappropriate access mode for branch transaction	
25004	X	25	invalid transaction state	004	inappropriate isolation level for branch transaction	
25005	X	25	invalid transaction state	005	no active SQL-transaction for branch transaction	
25006	X	25	invalid transaction state	006	read-only SQL-transaction	
25007	X	25	invalid transaction state	007	schema and data statement mixing not supported	
25008	X	25	invalid transaction state	008	held cursor requires same isolation level	
26000	X	26	invalid SQL statement name	000	(no subclass)	
27000	X	27	triggered data change violation	000	(no subclass)	
27001	X	27	triggered data change violation	001	modify table modified by data change delta table	
28000	X	28	invalid authorization specification	000	(no subclass)	
2B000	X	2B	dependent privilege descriptors still exist	000	(no subclass)	
2C000	X	2C	invalid character set name	000	(no subclass)	
2D000	X	2D	invalid transaction termination	000	(no subclass)	
2E000	X	2E	invalid connection name	000	(no subclass)	
2F000	X	2F	SQL routine exception	000	(no subclass)	
2F002	X	2F	SQL routine exception	002	modifying SQL-data not permitted	
2F003	X	2F	SQL routine exception	003	prohibited SQL-statement attempted	
2F004	X	2F	SQL routine exception	004	reading SQL-data not permitted	
2F005	X	2F	SQL routine exception	005	function executed no return statement	
2H000	X	2H	invalid collation name	000	(no subclass)	
30000	X	30	invalid SQL statement identifier	000	(no subclass)	
33000	X	33	invalid SQL descriptor name	000	(no subclass)	
34000	X	34	invalid cursor name	000	(no subclass)	
35000	X	35	invalid condition number	000	(no subclass)	
36000	X	36	cursor sensitivity exception	000	(no subclass)	
36001	X	36	cursor sensitivity exception	001	request rejected	
36002	X	36	cursor sensitivity exception	002	request failed	
38000	X	38	external routine exception	000	(no subclass)	
38001	X	38	external routine exception	001	containing SQL not permitted	
38002	X	38	external routine exception	002	modifying SQL-data not permitted	
38003	X	38	external routine exception	003	prohibited SQL-statement attempted	
38004	X	38	external routine exception	004	reading SQL-data not permitted	
39000	X	39	external routine invocation exception	000	(no subclass)	
39004	X	39	external routine invocation exception	004	null value not allowed	
3B000	X	3B	savepoint exception	000	(no subclass)	
3B001	X	3B	savepoint exception	001	invalid specification	
3B002	X	3B	savepoint exception	002	too many	
3C000	X	3C	ambiguous cursor name	000	(no subclass)	
3D000	X	3D	invalid catalog name	000	(no subclass)	
3F000	X	3F	invalid schema name	000	(no subclass)	
40000	X	40	transaction rollback	000	(no subclass)	
40001	X	40	transaction rollback	001	serialization failure	
40002	X	40	transaction rollback	002	integrity constraint violation	
40003	X	40	transaction rollback	003	statement completion unknown	
40004	X	40	transaction rollback	004	triggered action exception	
42000	X	42	syntax error or access rule violation	000	(no subclass)	
44000	X	44	with check option violation	000	(no subclass)	
45000	X	45	unhandled user-defined exception	000	(no subclass)	SQL/PSM
46000	X	46	OLB-specific error	000	(no subclass)	SQL/OLB
46001	X	46	Java DDL	001	invalid URL	SQL/JRT
46002	X	46	Java DDL	002	invalid JAR name	SQL/JRT
46003	X	46	Java DDL	003	invalid class deletion	SQL/JRT
46005	X	46	Java DDL	005	invalid replacement	SQL/JRT
4600A	X	46	Java DDL	00A	attempt to replace uninstalled JAR	SQL/JRT
4600B	X	46	Java DDL	00B	attempt to remove uninstalled JAR	SQL/JRT
4600C	X	46	Java DDL	00C	invalid JAR removal	SQL/JRT
4600D	X	46	Java DDL	00D	invalid path	SQL/JRT
4600E	X	46	Java DDL	00E	self-referencing path	SQL/JRT
46102	X	46	Java DDL	102	invalid JAR name in path	SQL/JRT
46103	X	46	Java DDL	103	unresolved class name	SQL/JRT
46110	X	46	OLB-specific error	110	unsupported feature	SQL/OLB
46120	X	46	OLB-specific error	120	invalid class declaration	SQL/OLB
46121	X	46	OLB-specific error	121	invalid column name	SQL/OLB
46122	X	46	OLB-specific error	122	invalid number of columns	SQL/OLB
46130	X	46	OLB-specific error	130	invalid profile state	SQL/OLB
HW000	X	HW	datalink exception	000	(no subclass)	SQL/MED
HW001	X	HW	datalink exception	001	external file not linked	SQL/MED
HW002	X	HW	datalink exception	002	external file already linked	SQL/MED
HW003	X	HW	datalink exception	003	referenced file does not exist	SQL/MED
HW004	X	HW	datalink exception	004	invalid write token	SQL/MED
HW005	X	HW	datalink exception	005	invalid datalink construction	SQL/MED
HW006	X	HW	datalink exception	006	invalid write permission for update	SQL/MED
HW007	X	HW	datalink exception	007	referenced file not valid	SQL/MED
HV000	X	HV	FDW-specific condition	000	(no subclass)	SQL/MED
HV001	X	HV	FDW-specific condition	001	memory allocation error	SQL/MED
HV002	X	HV	FDW-specific condition	002	dynamic parameter value needed	SQL/MED
HV004	X	HV	FDW-specific condition	004	invalid data type	SQL/MED
HV005	X	HV	FDW-specific condition	005	column name not found	SQL/MED
HV006	X	HV	FDW-specific condition	006	invalid data type descriptors	SQL/MED
HV007	X	HV	FDW-specific condition	007	invalid column name	SQL/MED
HV008	X	HV	FDW-specific condition	008	invalid column number	SQL/MED
HV009	X	HV	FDW-specific condition	009	invalid use of null pointer	SQL/MED
HV00A	X	HV	FDW-specific condition	00A	invalid string format	SQL/MED
HV00B	X	HV	FDW-specific condition	00B	invalid handle	SQL/MED
HV00C	X	HV	FDW-specific condition	00C	invalid option index	SQL/MED
HV00D	X	HV	FDW-specific condition	00D	invalid option name	SQL/MED
HV00J	X	HV	FDW-specific condition	00J	option name not found	SQL/MED
HV00K	X	HV	FDW-specific condition	00K	reply handle	SQL/MED
HV00L	X	HV	FDW-specific condition	00L	unable to create execution	SQL/MED
HV00M	X	HV	FDW-specific condition	00M	unable to create reply	SQL/MED
HV00N	X	HV	FDW-specific condition	00N	unable to establish connection	SQL/MED
HV00P	X	HV	FDW-specific condition	00P	no schemas	SQL/MED
HV00Q	X	HV	FDW-specific condition	00Q	schema not found	SQL/MED
HV00R	X	HV	FDW-specific condition	00R	table not found	SQL/MED
HV010	X	HV	FDW-specific condition	010	function sequence error	SQL/MED
HV014	X	HV	FDW-specific condition	014	limit on number of handles exceeded	SQL/MED
HV021	X	HV	FDW-specific condition	021	inconsistent descriptor information	SQL/MED
HV024	X	HV	FDW-specific condition	024	invalid attribute value	SQL/MED
HV090	X	HV	FDW-specific condition	090	invalid string length or buffer length	SQL/MED
HV091	X	HV	FDW-specific condition	091	invalid descriptor field identifier	SQL/MED
HY000	X	HY	CLI-specific condition	000	(no subclass)	SQL/CLI
HY???	X	HY	CLI-specific condition	—N/a	dynamic parameter value needed	SQL/CLI
HY???	X	HY	CLI-specific condition	—N/a	invalid handle	SQL/CLI
HY001	X	HY	CLI-specific condition	001	memory allocation error	SQL/CLI
HY003	X	HY	CLI-specific condition	003	invalid data type in application descriptor	SQL/CLI
HY004	X	HY	CLI-specific condition	004	invalid data type	SQL/CLI
HY007	X	HY	CLI-specific condition	007	associated statement is not prepared	SQL/CLI
HY008	X	HY	CLI-specific condition	008	operation canceled	SQL/CLI
HY009	X	HY	CLI-specific condition	009	invalid use of null pointer	SQL/CLI
HY010	X	HY	CLI-specific condition	010	function sequence error	SQL/CLI
HY011	X	HY	CLI-specific condition	011	attribute cannot be set now	SQL/CLI
HY012	X	HY	CLI-specific condition	012	invalid transaction operation code	SQL/CLI
HY013	X	HY	CLI-specific condition	013	memory management error	SQL/CLI
HY014	X	HY	CLI-specific condition	014	limit on number of handles exceeded	SQL/CLI
HY017	X	HY	CLI-specific condition	017	invalid use of automatically allocated descriptor handle	SQL/CLI
HY018	X	HY	CLI-specific condition	018	server declined the cancellation request	SQL/CLI
HY019	X	HY	CLI-specific condition	019	non-string data cannot be sent in pieces	SQL/CLI
HY020	X	HY	CLI-specific condition	020	attempt to concatenate a null value	SQL/CLI
HY021	X	HY	CLI-specific condition	021	inconsistent descriptor information	SQL/CLI
HY024	X	HY	CLI-specific condition	024	invalid attribute value	SQL/CLI
HY055	X	HY	CLI-specific condition	055	non-string data cannot be used with string routine	SQL/CLI
HY090	X	HY	CLI-specific condition	090	invalid string length or buffer length	SQL/CLI
HY091	X	HY	CLI-specific condition	091	invalid descriptor field identifier	SQL/CLI
HY092	X	HY	CLI-specific condition	092	invalid attribute identifier	SQL/CLI
HY093	X	HY	CLI-specific condition	093	invalid datalink value	SQL/MED
HY095	X	HY	CLI-specific condition	095	invalid FunctionId specified	SQL/CLI
HY096	X	HY	CLI-specific condition	096	invalid information type	SQL/CLI
HY097	X	HY	CLI-specific condition	097	column type out of range	SQL/CLI
HY098	X	HY	CLI-specific condition	098	scope out of range	SQL/CLI
HY099	X	HY	CLI-specific condition	099	nullable type out of range	SQL/CLI
HY103	X	HY	CLI-specific condition	103	invalid retrieval code	SQL/CLI
HY104	X	HY	CLI-specific condition	104	invalid LengthPrecision value	SQL/CLI
HY105	X	HY	CLI-specific condition	105	invalid parameter mode	SQL/CLI
HY106	X	HY	CLI-specific condition	106	invalid fetch orientation	SQL/CLI
HY107	X	HY	CLI-specific condition	107	row value out of range	SQL/CLI
HY108	X	HY	CLI-specific condition	108	invalid cursor position	SQL/CLI
HYC00	X	HY	CLI-specific condition	C00	optional feature not implemented	SQL/CLI
HZ???	?	HZ	Reserved for ISO9579 (RDA)	?		
