= SQL/PSM =

SQL extension

- Paradigm: Multi-paradigm
- First appeared: 1996
- Stable release: SQL:2023
- OS: Cross-platform (multi-platform)

Major implementations
- PL/SQL; MySQL/MariaDB; IBM's SQL PL; Mimer SQL; PL/pgSQL

Influenced by
- PL/SQL; Ada

SQL/PSM (SQL/Persistent Stored Modules) is an ISO standard mainly defining an extension of SQL with a procedural language for use in stored procedures. Initially published in 1996 as an extension of SQL-92 (ISO/IEC 9075-4:1996, a version sometimes called PSM-96 or even SQL-92/PSM), SQL/PSM was later incorporated into the multi-part SQL:1999 standard, and has been part 4 of that standard since then, most recently in SQL:2023. The SQL:1999 part 4 covered less than the original PSM-96 because the SQL statements for defining, managing, and invoking routines were actually incorporated into part 2 SQL/Foundation, leaving only the procedural language itself as SQL/PSM. The SQL/PSM facilities are still optional as far as the SQL standard is concerned; most of them are grouped in Features P001-P008.

SQL/PSM standardizes syntax and semantics for control flow, exception handling (called "condition handling" in SQL/PSM), local variables, assignment of expressions to variables and parameters, and (procedural) use of cursors. It also defines an information schema (metadata) for stored procedures. SQL/PSM is one language in which methods for the SQL:1999 structured types can be defined. The other is Java, via SQL/JRT.

SQL/PSM is derived, seemingly directly, from Oracle's PL/SQL. Oracle developed PL/SQL and released it in 1991, basing the language on the US Department of Defense's Ada programming language. However, Oracle has maintained a distance from the standard in its documentation. IBM's SQL PL (used in DB2) and Mimer SQL's PSM were the first two products officially implementing SQL/PSM. It is commonly thought that these two languages, and perhaps also MySQL/MariaDB's procedural language, are closest to the SQL/PSM standard. However, a PostgreSQL addon implements SQL/PSM (alongside its other procedural languages like the PL/SQL-derived plpgsql), although it is not part of the core product.

RDF functionality in OpenLink Virtuoso was developed entirely through SQL/PSM, combined with custom datatypes (e.g., ANY for handling URI and Literal relation objects), sophisticated indexing, and flexible physical storage choices (column-wise or row-wise).

== See also ==
The following implementations adopt the standard, but they are not 100% compatible to SQL/PSM:

Open source:

- HSQLDB stored procedures and functions
- MySQL stored procedures
- MariaDB stored procedures
- OpenLink Virtuoso SQL Procedures (VSP)
- PostgreSQL PL/pgSQL

Proprietary:

- Oracle PL/SQL
- Microsoft and Sybase Transact-SQL
- Invantive Procedural SQL
- Mimer SQL stored procedures
