= Bulk insert =

A Bulk insert is a process or method provided by a database management system to load multiple rows of data into a database table.

Bulk insert may refer to:

- Transact-SQL BULK INSERT statement
- PL/SQL BULK COLLECT and FORALL statements
- MySQL LOAD DATA INFILE statement
- PostgreSQL COPY statement
