= EAServer =

Application server

EAServer is an application server developed by the company Sybase. It includes an integrated set of tools used to create and run web applications with support for high levels of traffic, dynamic content and intensive processing of online transactions.

EAServer provides the necessary infrastructure to run applications distributed based on components, residing in the middle layer of a multi-layer architecture, between the application client and the remote database.

EAServer allows the efficient management of client sessions, security, threads, connections to the database and flow of transactions, without requiring specialized knowledge on the part of the developer.

The most recent versions of EAServer are 5.5 and 6.1 (last revised 12/12/2007).

== Main features ==
EAServer includes the following features:

- A scalable execution engine, multi-threading, and independent of the platform
- Support for stubs and proxies for major component models, including JavaBeans, PowerBuilder, Java, ActiveX, and C / C++
- Dynamic HTML support using Java Servlets and JavaServer Pages (JSP)
- Support for the platform development Java 2 Enterprise Edition (J2EE)
- Graphic administration through Sybase Central, which includes component management, security, transaction monitoring, etc.
- Close integration with the development environment of PowerBuilder
- Transparent management of client sessions and component life cycle
- Cache of connections to databases
- Standard name resolution services
- Transaction management that simplifies the design and implementation of an application transactions
- Simplified use of data and shared resources
- Support to result sets that allow the efficient recovery of tabular data in the applications client
- Declarative and role-based security that restricts client connections and components that can be invoked by a specific client session
- Support to asynchronous messaging and processing
- "Redirector Plugin" for web servers, which redirects the client's requirements directly to the web server
- Support for multiple network protocols, including IIOP, TDS (Tabular Data Stream from Sybase), HTTP and TLS

== Supported platforms ==
Among the operating systems supported by EAServer are:

- Linux
- HP-UX
- Sun Solaris
- IBM AIX
- Microsoft Windows

== See also ==
- Sybase
- Application server
