= SQL Developer =

SQL Developer may refer to:

- Oracle SQL Developer, a free SQL IDE from Oracle Corporation
- PL/SQL Developer, an IDE for PL/SQL development from Allround Automations
- SOLYP SQL Developer, a generic proprietary database-tool written by Jan Borchers
