= CLSQL =

- Developer: Kevin M. Rosenberg
- Stable release: 6.7.2 / 2022-10-29
- Written in: Common Lisp
- Operating system: Cross-platform
- Type: ORDBMS
- License: MIT License
- Website: clsql.b9.com
- Repository: git.kpe.io?p=clsql.git

CLSQL is an SQL database interface for Common Lisp. It was created in 2001 by Kevin M. Rosenberg, and initially based substantially on the MaiSQL package by Pierre R. Mai. After being orphaned by onShore Development, Marcus Pearce ported the UnCommonSQL package to CLSQL, which provides a CommonSQL-compatible API for CLSQL.

CLSQL can be used to query and interface with MySQL, PostgreSQL, ODBC, AODBC, SQLite version 2 and 3, and Oracle OCI.
