= Oracle Call Interface =

The Oracle Call Interface (OCI) consists of a set of C-language software APIs which provide an interface to the Oracle database.

OCI offers a procedural API for not only performing certain database administration tasks (such as system startup and shutdown), but also for using PL/SQL or SQL to query, access, and manipulate data. The OCI library, based on Oracle's undocumented User Programmatic Interface (UPI), acts as an "interpreter" between applications and the low-level database network protocol.

== History ==
Oracle Corporation first released OCI (under the name HLI, the Host Language Interface) with Oracle Database version 6 in 1988. As HLI (and subsequently OCI) operated as wrappers for UPI, their original naming conventions closely resembled those of the UPI calls they were based upon. For example, the rollback statement: the call upirol in UPI became orol in OCI.

Later, in Oracle8 (released in 1997), OCI calls acquired more descriptive names; orol became OCITransRollback. Subsequent improvements have been made in every version of OCI, including 11g (released in 2007). Oracle Corporation claims that OCI is "So reliable that every SQL statement in the Oracle Database executes with OCI".

== Implementations ==
OCI is so popular that, in addition to Oracle, several other vendors have implemented their own libraries compatible with the OCI API. To date, OCI-compatible libraries exist for the ANTs Data Server (ADS), EnterpriseDB, and the Linter SQL RDBMS

== OCI-based libraries ==
Several libraries are based on top of OCI, including:

- Oracle's Type-II JDBC Driver (part-Java, part native)
- Oracle's enhanced C++ library, Oracle C++ Call Interface (OCCI), which provides an object-oriented interface with the object-relational features of the Oracle database.
- Oracle's OLE DB Driver
- Oracle's ODBC Driver
- Oracle's .NET Data Provider, ODP.NET
- Microsoft's ODBC Driver for Oracle
- Easysoft's ODBC-Oracle Driver
- Trolltech's Qt C++ toolkit OCI driver (QOCI)

Due to the complexity of the OCI API, several easier-to-use OCI wrapper libraries also exist, such as:

- the open-source libsqlora8 library (deprecated).
- the open-source OCILIB library.
- the Open BSD licensed Oracle Template Library OTL library.
