= $0 =

$0 may refer to:

- The program name stored in argv[0], in Shell scripts
- The current Document Object Model (DOM) node in Chrome web browser
- The polymorphic return value in PL/pgSQL
- "$0", a song from the 2024 album Heavy Metal by Cameron Winter
