= Mimer SQL =

- Developer: Mimer AB
- Stable release: 11.0.9H / 27 August 2026; 60 days ago
- Preview release: 11.1.0B / 26 October 2026; 0 days ago
- Operating system: OpenVMS, Microsoft Windows, macOS, Linux
- License: Proprietary
- Website: www.mimer.com
- Repository: https://developer.mimer.com/products/downloads/

Mimer SQL is a proprietary SQL-based relational database management system produced by the Swedish company Mimer Information Technology AB (Mimer AB), formerly known as Upright Database Technology AB. It was originally developed as a research project at the Uppsala University, Uppsala, Sweden in the 1970s before being developed into a commercial product.

The database has been deployed in a wide range of application situations, including the National Health Service Pulse blood transfusion service in the UK, Volvo Cars production line in Sweden and automotive dealers in Australia. It has sometimes been one of the limited options available in realtime critical applications and resource restricted situations such as mobile devices.

== History ==
Mimer SQL originated from a project from the ITC service center supporting Uppsala University and some other institutions to leverage the relational database capabilities proposed by Codd and others. The initial release in about 1975 was designated RAPID and was written in IBM assembler language. The name was changed to Mimer in 1977 to avoid a trademark issue. Other universities were interested in the project on a number of machine architectures and Mimer was rewritten in Fortran to achieve portability. Further models were developed for Mimer with the Mimer/QL implementing the QUEL query languages.

The emergence of SQL in the 1980s as the standard query language resulted in Mimers' developers choosing to adopt it with the product becoming Mimer SQL.

In 1984 Mimer was transferred to the newly established company Mimer Information Systems.

== Versions ==
As of July 2025 the Mimer SQL database server is currently supported on the main platforms of Windows, MacOS, Linux, QNX, and OpenVMS (Itanium and x86-64). Previous versions of the database engine was supported on other operating systems including Solaris, AIX, HP-UX, Tru 64, SCO and DNIX. Versions of Mimer SQL are available for download and free for development.

The Enterprise product is a standards based SQL database server based upon the Mimer SQL Experience database server. This product is highly configurable at build time, and components can be added, removed or replacing in the foundation product to achieve a derived product suitable for embedded, or small footprint application.

For resource limited environments is the Mimer SQL Mobile database server a replacement runtime environment without a SQL compiler. This is used for portable and certain custom devices and is termed the Mobile Approach. Additionally cancustom embedded approaches be applied to multiple hardware and operating system combinations.

These options enable Mimer SQL to be deployed to a wide variety of additional target platforms, such as Android, and real-time operating systems including QNX.

The database is available in embedded and automotive specialist versions requiring no maintenance, with the intention to make the product suitable for mission-critical automotive, process automation and telecommunication systems.

In May 2025 was a joint product between the British company Trustonic and Mimer announced, called Mimer Trust. Mimer Trust leverages the ARM architecture's TrustZone concept and adds the capability to not only store data inside the TrustZone for added security.

== Features ==
Mimer SQL provides support for multiple database application programming interfaces (APIs): ODBC, JDBC, ADO.NET, Embedded SQL (C/C++, Cobol and Fortran), Module SQL (C/C++, Cobol, Fortran and Pascal), and the native API's Mimer SQL C API, Mimer SQL Real-Time API, and Mimer SQL Micro C API.

MimerPy is an adapter for Mimer SQL in Python, which also enables support for SQLAlchemy.

The Mimer Provider Manager is an ADO.NET provider dispatcher that uses different plugins to access different underlying ADO.NET providers. The Mimer Provider Manager makes it possible to write database independent ADO.NET applications.

Mimer SQL mainly uses optimistic concurrency control (OCC) to manage concurrent transactions.

Mimer SQL is assigned port 1360 in the Internet Assigned Numbers Authority (IANA) registry.

== Etymology ==
The name "Mimer" is taken from the Norse mythology, where Mimer was the giant guarding Mímisbrunnr - the well of wisdom. Metaphorically this is what a database system is doing – managing data.

== See also ==
- Werner Schneider – the professor who started the development section for the relational database that became Mimer SQL (Swedish article)
