= Pro*C =

Programming language used with Oracle databases

Pro*C (also known as Pro*C/C++) is an embedded SQL programming language used by Oracle Database DBMSes. Pro*C uses either C or C++ as its host language. During compilation, the embedded SQL statements are interpreted by a precompiler and replaced by C or C++ function calls to their respective SQL library. The output from the Pro*C precompiler is standard C or C++ code that is then compiled by any one of several C or C++ compilers into an executable.
