= Module SQL =

Computer programming method

Module SQL is a method of combining the computing power of a programming language and the database manipulation capabilities of SQL. Module SQL statements are SQL statements written in an SQL client module, that can be called as routines from the host language program source code like a host language routine. An SQL standard Module Language file is compiled into calls to a SQL runtime library that interacts with the Database management system. This allows programmers to call SQL statements from applications written in regular programming languages.

Using Module Language is very straightforward: place all SQL code in a separate module, and define an interface between the module containing the SQL code and the host program.

Module SQL is closely related to Embedded SQL. "SQL client modules are self-contained collections of SQL statements. Unlike embedded SQL, in which the SQL statements are inserted into the host programming language, SQL client modules are separate from the host language. The host language contains calls that invoke the module, which in turn executes the SQL statements within that module."

== SQL Standard Compliance ==
The SQL:2023 standard (ISO/IEC 9075-2:2023 Information technology — Database languages SQL — Part 2: Foundation (SQL/Foundation), chapter 13) defines an SQL module as an SQL client module, and the language in which SQL queries are called is referred to as the host language. Specified host languages are:

- Ada - Feature B111, “Module language Ada”
- C - Feature B112, “Module language C”
- COBOL - Feature B113, “Module language COBOL”
- Fortran - Feature B114, “Module language Fortran”
- MUMPS - Feature B115, “Module language MUMPS”
- Pascal - Feature B116, “Module language Pascal”
- PL/I - Feature B117, “Module language PL/I”

(All the languages listed above are optional features, which means that each vendor can decide which language(s) to support.)

== Database systems that support module SQL ==
=== Mimer SQL ===
Mimer SQL 11.0 and later for Linux, macOS, OpenVMS and Windows support module SQL for C/C++, and Mimer SQL for OpenVMS also supports module SQL for COBOL, Fortran and Pascal.

=== Oracle Database ===
Oracle 8.0 supported SQL*Module for Ada but support has been removed in later versions. SQL*Module is a module language that supports the Ada83 language standard for Ada.

=== Oracle Rdb ===
Supported host languages are Ada, BASIC, C, COBOL, Fortran, Pascal and PL/I.
