= PL/SQL Developer =

Integrated development environment

- Developer: Allround Automations
- Release: 1998; 28 years ago
- Stable release: 16.0.8 (Build 2175) / 24 November 2025; 8 months ago
- Website: www.allroundautomations.com/products/pl-sql-developer/

PL/SQL Developer, is an integrated development environment for developing software in the Oracle database environment. It focuses on the development of PL/SQL stored-program units. Allround Automations, based in Enschede in the Netherlands, markets the software.

== Plugins ==
PL/SQL Developer functionality can be extended with plugins. Documentation and plugin development examples are distributed with the application.

On the application website, plugins developed by Allround Automations and third-party users are available for download.

The third-party rrProject plugin adds its own helpers for writing code and navigating through it, a multifunctional search at the IDE, and other extensions.

== History ==
PL/SQL Developer versions
Version	Release date	Description
16.0.0	November, 2024	
15.0.0	April 4, 2022	
14.0.0	April 17, 2020	
13.0.0	December 21, 2018	
12.0.0	February 7, 2017	
11.0.6	April 22, 2016	
11.0.5	February 12, 2016	
11.0.4-64bit	December 29, 2015	
11.0.4	September 1, 2015	
11.0.3	June 10, 2015	
11.0.2	April 24, 2015	
11.0.1	April 13, 2015	
11.0	March 3, 2015	
10.0.5	July 11, 2013	
10.0.4	June 6, 2013	
10.0.3	May 6, 2013	
10.0.2	April 4, 2013	
10.0.1	March 8, 2013	
10.0	March 1, 2013	
9.0.6.1665	March 12, 2012	
9.0.6	February 24, 2012	
9.0.5	January 24, 2012	
9.0.4	December 20, 2011	
9.0.3	November 24, 2011	
9.0.2	October 13, 2011	
9.0.1	September 5, 2011	
9.0	July 19, 2011	
8.0.4	June 11, 2010	
8.0.3	April 2, 2010	
8.0.2	February 11, 2010	
8.0.1.1502	January 7, 2010	
8.0.1.1501	January 5, 2010	
8.0.1	December 14, 2009	
8.0	September 26, 2009	
7.1.5.1398	May 26, 2008	
7.1.5.1397	April 18, 2008	
7.1.5	March 25, 2008	
7.1.4	November 2, 2007	
7.1.3	September 27, 2007	
7.1.2	August 13, 2007	
7.1.1	May 10, 2007	
7.1	April 23, 2007	
7.0.3	September 22, 2006	
7.0.2	May 15, 2006	
7.0.1	March 1, 2006	
7.0	January 23, 2006	
6.0.6.947	November 1, 2005	
6.0.6.946	October 22, 2005	
6.0.5.931	March 23, 2005	
6.0.5	March 14, 2005	
6.0.4	January 5, 2005	
6.0.3	October 11, 2004	
6.0.2	September 14, 2004	
6.0.1	August 25, 2004	
6.0.0	August 10, 2004	
5.1.6	March 24, 2004	
5.1.5	March 6, 2004	
5.1.4	November 6, 2003	
5.1.3	July 17, 2003	
5.1.2	April 29, 2003	
5.1.1	March 13, 2003	
5.1.0	January 27, 2003	
5.0.3	June 22, 2002	
5.0.2	April 8, 2002	
5.0.1	January 5, 2002	
5.0.0	December 10, 2001	
4.0.3	October 8, 2001	
4.0.2	July 16, 2001	
4.0.0	March 15, 2001	
3.0.5	October 14, 2000	
3.0.4	August 28, 2000	
3.0.3	June 26, 2000	
3.0.2	March 21, 2000	
3.0.1	February 7, 2000	
3.0	December 22, 1999	
2.1.3	August 1999	
2.1.2	May 1999	
2.1.1	March 1999	
2.1	February 1999	
2.0	November 1998	
