= SQL Access Group =

Software standards consortium

The SQL Access Group (SAG) was a group of software companies that was formed in 1989 to define and promote standards for database portability and interoperability. Initial members were Oracle Corporation, Informix, Ingres, DEC, Tandem, Sun and HP.

The SAG started the development of the SQL Call Level Interface which later was published as an X/Open specification.

In 1992, Microsoft released version 1.0 of ODBC which was based on the X/Open SQL CLI specification.

The SQL Access Group transferred its activities and assets to X/Open in the fourth quarter of 1994.
