= SQL/MED =

Structured Query Language standard

The SQL/MED ("Management of External Data") extension to the SQL standard is defined by ISO/IEC 9075-9:2008 (originally defined for SQL:2003). SQL/MED provides extensions to SQL that define foreign-data wrappers and datalink types to allow SQL to manage external data. External data is data that is accessible to, but not managed by, an SQL-based DBMS. This standard can be used in the development of federated database systems.

== Implementations ==
- PostgreSQL has support for some SQL/MED since version 9.1.
- LucidDB has support for SQL/MED.
- MariaDB has support for SQL/MED with the CONNECT storage engine. The implementation uses different syntax than the official standard.
- Farrago has support for SQL/MED.
- IBM Db2 has support for SQL/MED.
- Teiid has support for SQL/MED.
- Microsoft SQL Server has internal support for SQL/MED. DATALINK is provided by the FILESTREAM (SQL Server 2008) and FileTable (SQL Server 2012) functionnalities and external data wrapper by the EXTERNAL TABLEs and PolyBase.

== See also ==
- SQL
- SQL:2008
- SQL:2003
