= Alpha (programming language) =

Database language proposed by Edgar F. Codd

The Alpha language was the original database language proposed by Edgar F. Codd, the inventor of the relational database approach. It was defined in Codd's 1971 paper "A Data Base Sublanguage Founded on the Relational Calculus". Alpha influenced the design of QUEL. It was eventually supplanted by SQL (which is however based on the relational algebra defined by Codd in "Relational Completeness of Data Base Sublanguages"), which IBM developed for its first commercial relational database product.

== See also ==
- QUEL query languages
