= SQL/OLB =

SQL/OLB, or Object Language Bindings, is a standard for embedding SQL in Java, commonly known by its prior name as SQLJ (part 0). Besides describing the syntax and semantics of SQLJ, which are typically given relative to JDBC, the standard also describes mechanisms to ensure binary portability of SQLJ applications, and specifies various Java packages and their contained classes.

SQL/OLB was informally known as "SQLJ part 0" before standardization, which first occurred under the aegis of ANSI in 1998 and then ISO in 2000. Although the latter was published after the bulk of SQL:1999, officially it was "part 10" of that standard—a convention that was maintained for subsequent ISO SQL standards, including the current one, SQL:2011.

== Examples ==
For some (possibly outdated) examples, see the article on SQLJ.

== Implementations ==
Both Oracle 8i and IBM DB2 introduced support around 1999. Oracle 12c claims conformance with SQL/OLB:1999, but not with the newer SQL/OLB:2008.

== See also ==
- SQL
- SQLJ (an outdated term for SQL/OLB)
- SQL:2003
- Language Integrated Query
