= IBM Db2 =

Relational model database server

IBM Db2 for Linux, UNIX and Windows
- Logo as of 2005
- Developer: IBM
- Release: 1983; 43 years ago

Stable release(s)
- 12.1 / 14 November 2024; 2 years ago
- Written in: C, C++, assembly, Java
- Operating system: Linux, AIX, Windows. Solaris and HP-UX before version 11.
- Platform: Linux (x64, Power, Z), AIX, Windows x64
- Size: 1.6 GB
- Available in: English, Spanish, French, German, Russian, Japanese
- Type: RDBMS
- License: Proprietary commercial software, Proprietary EULA

IBM Db2 for z/OS
- Developer: IBM
- Release: 1983; 43 years ago
- Stable release: 13.1
- Written in: PL/X, C, C++, assembly
- Operating system: z/OS
- Platform: z/Architecture
- Available in: English
- Type: RDBMS
- License: Proprietary EULA
- Website: ibm.com/products/db2-for-zos

Db2 is a family of data management products, including database servers, developed by IBM. It initially supported the relational model, but was extended to support object–relational features and non-relational structures like JSON and XML. The brand name was originally styled as DB2 until 2017, when it changed to its present form. In the early days, it was sometimes wrongly styled as DB/2 in a false derivation from the operating system OS/2.

== History ==
DB2 traces its roots to the beginning of the 1970s, when Edgar F. Codd, a researcher working for IBM, described the theory of relational databases, and in June 1970, published the model for data manipulation.

In 1974, the IBM San Jose Research Center developed a related database management system (DBMS) called System R, to implement Codd's concepts. A key development of the System R project was the Structured Query Language (SQL). To apply the relational model, Codd needed a relational-database language he named DSL/Alpha. At the time, IBM did not believe in the potential of Codd's ideas, leaving the implementation to a group of programmers not under Codd's supervision. This led to an inexact interpretation of Codd's relational model that matched only part of the prescriptions of the theory; the result was Structured English QUEry Language or SEQUEL.

IBM bought Metaphor Computer Systems to use their graphical user interface (GUI) and encapsulating SQL platform that had already been in use since the mid-80s.

In parallel with the development of SQL, IBM also developed Query by Example (QBE), the first graphical query language.

IBM's first commercial relational-database product, SQL/DS, was released for the DOS/VSE and VM/CMS operating systems in 1981. In 1976, IBM released Query by Example for the VM platform where the table-oriented front-end produced a linear-syntax language that drove transactions to its relational database. Later, the QMF feature of DB2 produced real SQL, and brought the same "QBE" look and feel to DB2. The inspiration for the mainframe version of DB2's architecture came in part from IBM IMS, a hierarchical database, and its dedicated database-manipulation language, IBM DL/I.

The name DB2 (IBM Database 2), was first given to the database management system in 1983 when IBM released DB2 on its MVS mainframe platform. IBM's endorsement of SQL in Db2 caused the industry to move to it from alternatives like Ingres's QUEL. Db2 became generally available to customers in 1985, and by 1989 revenue of about $1 billion had grown to equal IMS's.

For some years DB2, as a full-function DBMS, was only available on IBM mainframes. Later, IBM brought DB2 to other platforms, including OS/2, UNIX, and MS Windows servers, and then Linux (including Linux on IBM Z) and PDAs. This process occurred through the 1990s. An implementation of DB2 is also available for z/VSE and z/VM. An earlier version of the code that would become DB2 LUW (Linux, Unix, Windows) was part of an Extended Edition component of OS/2 called Database Manager.

IBM extended the functionality of Database Manager a number of times, including the addition of distributed database functionality by means of Distributed Relational Database Architecture (DRDA) that allowed shared access to a database in a remote location on a LAN. (Note that DRDA is based on objects and protocols defined by Distributed Data Management Architecture (DDM).)

Eventually, IBM rewrote the software. The new version of Database Manager were called DB2/2 and DB2/6000 respectively. Other versions of DB2, with different code bases, followed the same '/' naming convention and became DB2/400 (for the AS/400), DB2/VSE (for the DOS/VSE environment), and DB2/VM (for the VM operating system). IBM lawyers stopped this naming convention from being used and so that all products needed to be called "product FOR platform" (for example, DB2 for OS/390). The next iteration of the mainframe and the server-based products was named DB2 Universal Database (or DB2 UDB).

=== Db2 for LUW ===
In the mid-1990s, IBM released a clustered DB2 implementation called DB2 Parallel Edition, which initially ran on AIX. This edition allowed scalability by providing a shared-nothing architecture, in which a single large database is partitioned across multiple DB2 servers that communicate over a high-speed interconnect. This DB2 edition was eventually ported to all Linux, UNIX, and Windows (LUW) platforms, and was renamed to DB2 Extended Enterprise Edition (EEE). IBM now refers to this product as the Database Partitioning Feature (DPF) and bundles it with their flagship DB2 Enterprise product.

When Informix Corporation acquired Illustra and made their database engine an object-SQL DBMS by introducing their Universal Server, both Oracle Corporation and IBM followed suit by changing their database engines to be capable of object–relational extensions. In 2001, IBM bought Informix Software, and in the following years incorporated Informix technology into the DB2 product suite. DB2 can technically be considered to be an object–SQL DBMS.

In mid-2006, IBM announced "Viper", the codename for DB2 9 on both distributed platforms and z/OS. DB2 9 for z/OS was announced in early 2007. IBM claimed that the new DB2 was the first relational database to store XML "natively". Other enhancements include OLTP-related improvements for distributed platforms, business intelligence/data warehousing-related improvements for z/OS, more self-tuning and self-managing features, additional 64-bit exploitation (especially for virtual storage on z/OS), stored procedure performance enhancements for z/OS, and continued convergence of the SQL vocabularies between z/OS and distributed platforms.

In October 2007, IBM announced "Viper 2", the codename for DB2 9.5 on the distributed platforms. There were three key themes for the release, simplified management, business critical reliability, and Agile XML development.

In June 2009, IBM announced "Cobra", the codename for DB2 9.7 for LUW. DB2 9.7 added data compression for database indexes, temporary tables, and large objects. DB2 9.7 also supported native XML data in hash partitioning (database partitioning), range partitioning (table partitioning), and multi-dimensional clustering. These native XML features allow users to directly work with XML in data warehouse environments. DB2 9.7 also added several features that make it easier for Oracle Database users to work with DB2. These include support for the most commonly used SQL syntax, PL/SQL syntax, scripting syntax, and data types from Oracle Database. DB2 9.7 also enhanced its concurrency model to exhibit behavior that is familiar to users of Oracle Database and Microsoft SQL Server.

In October 2009, IBM also introduced DB2 pureScale; a cluster database for non-mainframe platforms, suitable for online transaction processing (OLTP) workloads. IBM based the design of DB2 pureScale on the Parallel Sysplex implementation of DB2 data sharing on the mainframe. DB2 pureScale provides a fault-tolerant architecture and shared-disk storage. A DB2 pureScale system can grow to 128 database servers, and provides continuous availability and automatic load balancing.

In 2009, it was announced that DB2 can be an engine in MySQL. This allows users on the IBM i platform and users on other platforms to access these files through the MySQL interface. On IBM i and its predecessor OS/400, DB2 is tightly integrated into the operating system, and comes as part of the operating system. It provides journaling, triggers and other features.

In early 2012, IBM announced DB2 10.1 (code name Galileo) for Linux, UNIX, and Windows. DB2 10.1 contained a number of new data management capabilities including row and column access control which enables 'fine-grained' control of the database and multi-temperature data management that moves data to cost effective storage based on how "hot" or "cold" (how frequently the data is accessed) the data is. IBM also introduced "adaptive compression" capability in DB2 10.1, a new approach to compressing data tables.

In June 2013, IBM released DB2 10.5.

On 12 April 2016, IBM announced DB2 LUW 11.1, and in June 2016, it was released.

In mid-2017, IBM re-branded its DB2 and dashDB product offerings and amended their names to "Db2".

On June 27, 2019, IBM released Db2 11.5, the AI Database. It added artificial intelligence (AI) functionality to improve query performance as well as capabilities to facilitate AI application development.

=== Db2 for z/OS – evolution ===
In 1995, GA (general availability) of V4. It introduced "data sharing": several DB2 engines access the same data. Advantages: performance and availability (if one DB2 engine fails or is migrated to the next version).

In 1997, GA of V5. It added, e.g., online reorganization of tablespaces.

In 1999, GA of V6. It added object-relational support. "Objects" here mean data items longer than 32K (up to then the maximal length of a table row, more precisely a table record), such as images, videos, or text. DB2 could now store and handle such objects. Furthermore, it added trigger support.

In 2001, GA of V7. It added, e.g., dynamic allocation of data sets (~files on z/OS), and the ability to let utilities run on lists of tablespaces. Furthermore, real-time statistics, scrollable cursors, and initial Unicode support.

In 2004, GA of V8. It added, e.g., 64-bit support. New index types (notably DPSI), recursive SQL. Internal catalog is converted to Unicode.

In 2007, GA of V9. It added, e.g., Trusted Context (a security feature), and "native XML" support.

In 2010, GA of V10. It added, e.g., Temporal Tables (e.g., row history), security features like separation of system and security administrators, and RCAC (row column access control).

In 2013, GA of V11. It added, e.g., JSON support.

In 2016, GA of V12. It added, e.g., RESTful services; and usage of AI to optimize the selection of the access path to the data, thus enhancing performance.

On May 31, 2022, IBM released Db2 13 for z/OS.

=== Db2 Warehouse ===
"Data warehousing" was first mentioned in a 1988 IBM Systems Journal article entitled, "An Architecture for Business Information Systems." This article illustrated the first use-case for data warehousing in a business setting as well as the results of its application.

Traditional transaction processing databases were not able to provide the insight business leaders needed to make data-informed decisions. A new approach was needed to aggregate and analyze data from multiple transactional sources to deliver new insights, uncover patterns, and find hidden relationships among the data. Db2 Warehouse, with its capabilities to normalize data from multiple sources, performs sophisticated analytic and statistical modeling, provides businesses these features at speed and scale.

Increases in computational power resulted in an explosion of data inside businesses generally and data warehouses specifically. Warehouses grew from being measured in GBs to TBs and PBs. As the volume and variety of data grew, Db2 Warehouse adapted. Initially purposed for star and snowflake schemas, Db2 Warehouse now includes support for the following data types and analytical models, among others:

- Relational data
- Non-Relational data
- XML data
- Geospatial data
- RStudio
- Apache Spark
- Embedded Spark Analytics engine
- Multi-Parallel Processing
- In-memory analytical processing
- Predictive Modeling algorithms

Db2 Warehouse uses Docker containers to run in multiple environments: on-premise, private cloud and a variety of public clouds, both managed and unmanaged. Db2 Warehouse can be deployed as software only, as an appliance and in Intel x86, Linux and mainframe platforms. Built upon IBM's Common SQL engine, Db2 Warehouse queries data from multiple sources—Oracle, Microsoft SQL Server, Teradata, open source, Netezza and others. Users write a query once and data returns from multiple sources.

== Db2 for IBM i ==
In 1994, IBM renamed the integrated relational database of the OS/400 to DB2/400 to indicate comparable functionality to DB2 on other platforms. Despite this name, it is not based on Db2 code, but instead it evolved from the IBM System/38 integrated database. The product is currently named IBM Db2 for i.

== Other Platforms ==
- Db2 for Linux, UNIX and Windows (informally known as Db2 LUW)
- Db2 for z/OS (mainframe)
- Db2 on IBM Cloud.

== Editions ==
IBM offers four editions of Db2: Community Edition, Starter Edition, Standard Edition, and Advanced Server Edition.

=== IBM Db2 Community Edition ===
IBM Db2 Community Edition is a free-to-download, free-to-use edition of the IBM Db2 database. Version 11.5 provides all core capabilities of Db2 but is limited to 4 virtual processor cores, 16 GB of instance memory, has no enterprise-level support, and no fix packs. Version 12.1, on the other hand, further limits the server memory to only 8 GB per virtual or physical server, and restricts use to non-production environments.

While there is no limit on the database size since version 11.5.1, some previous releases imposed a limit of 100 GB. A prior free Db2 version, the IBM DB2 Express-C, supported up to 16 GB RAM and two CPU cores.

=== Db2 Starter Edition ===
The Starter edition was introduced with Db2 version 12.1. It is a paid product, and has several limitations, including a limitation to 4 cores and 16 GB of memory, and restrictions on advanced functionality such as native encryption, audit logging, federation, Db2 pureScale, etc.

=== IBM Db2 Standard Edition ===
The Db2 Standard Edition is available as a perpetual software license for production and non-production use for up to 16 processor cores and 128 GB RAM with IBM support. For production use, Db2 Standard Edition can be licensed based on a Virtual Processor Core metric, wherein it is licensed by the total count of processor cores in a non-partitioned physical server, or virtual cores assigned to a virtual server. For non-production use, Db2 Standard Edition can be licensed based on the total count of authorized users.

=== IBM Db2 Advanced Edition ===
The Db2 Advanced Edition is available only as a component of the IBM Hybrid Data Management Platform (HDMP). Within HDMP, Db2 is available both as a perpetual software license AND a monthly subscription for unrestricted production and non-production use with premium IBM support. For both HDMP perpetual license and subscription offerings, FlexPoints need to be bought. FlexPoints are generic licensing credits that can be used to deploy any Db2-family software product or cloud service offering.

== Technical information ==
Db2 can be administered from either the command-line or a GUI. Db2 supports both SQL and XQuery. DB2 has a native implementation of XML data storage, where XML data is stored as XML (not as relational data or CLOB data) for faster access using XQuery.

Db2 has APIs for Rexx, PL/I, COBOL, RPG, Fortran, C++, C, Delphi, .NET CLI, Java, Python, Perl, PHP, Ruby, and many other programming languages. Db2 also supports integration into the Eclipse and Visual Studio integrated development environments.

pureQuery is IBM's data access platform focused on applications that access data. pureQuery supports both Java and .NET. pureQuery provides access to data in databases and in-memory Java objects via its tools, APIs, and runtime environment as delivered in IBM Data Studio Developer and IBM Data Studio pureQuery Runtime.

== See also ==
- Comparison of relational database management systems
- Comparison of database administration tools
- List of relational database management systems
- List of column-oriented DBMSes
- Data Language Interface
