= Sybase =

Enterprise software and services company

Sybase, Inc.

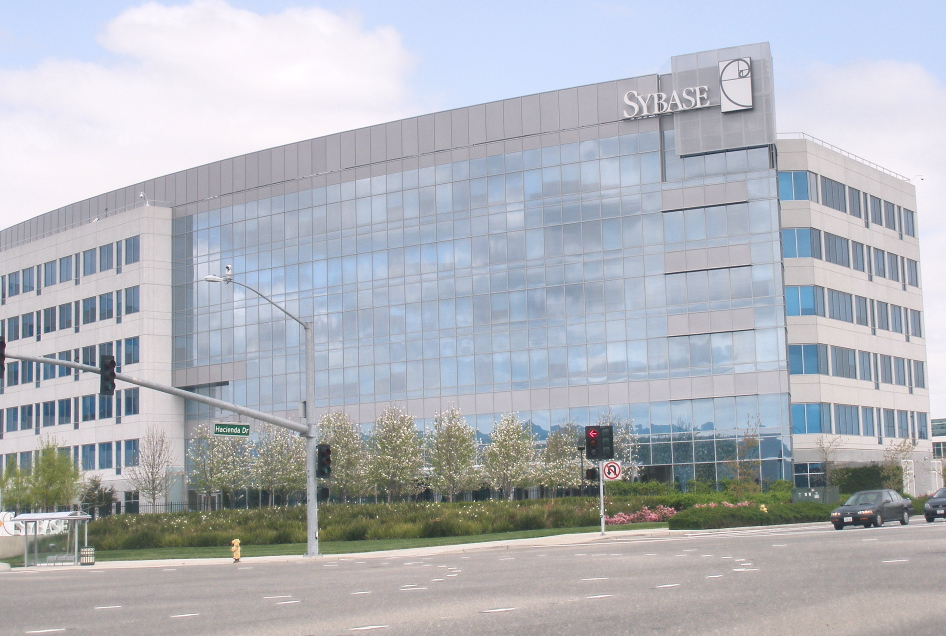
- Former headquarters in Dublin, California
- Type: Corporation (1984–2010); Subsidiary (2010–2012)
- Industry: Software
- Founded: 1984; 42 years ago in Berkeley, California
- Defunct: 2010
- Fate: Acquired by SAP
- Headquarters: Dublin, California (1994–2012)
- Key people: Mitchell E. Kertzman, President; John S. Chen, CEO & President
- Number of employees: 3,576 (2012)
- Parent: SAP (2010–2012)
- Website: www.sybase.com

Sybase, Inc. was an enterprise software and services company. The company produced software relating to relational databases, with facilities located in California and Massachusetts. Sybase was acquired by SAP in 2010; SAP ceased using the Sybase name in 2014.

== History ==
- 1984: Robert Epstein—formerly with Ingres—and Mark Hoffman leave Britton-Lee. They, Jane Doughty, and Tom Haggin start Sybase (initially trading as Systemware) in Epstein's home in Berkeley, California. Their first commercial location is half of an office suite at 2107 Dwight Way in Berkeley. They set out to create a relational database management system (RDBMS) that will organize information and make it available to computers within a network.
- March 1986: Systemware enters into talks with Microsoft to license Systemware Data Server (the later Sybase SQL Server), a database product built to run on UNIX computers. Those talks led to a product called Ashton-Tate/Microsoft SQL Server 1.0, shipping in May 1989.
- May 1991: Systemware changes its name to Sybase.
- January 1998: Sybase announces that it has found inconsistencies in profits reported from its Japanese division and will be restating company financial results for the last three quarters of 1997. Sybase determines that the inconsistencies are due to five executives in Sybase's Japanese subsidiary found to have used side letters to artificially inflate the profits from their operations. Following a class-action lawsuit, the five executives involved are fired.
- November 1998: John S. Chen is appointed Chairman, CEO, and President.
- 2007: Sybase crosses the $1 billion revenue mark.
- March 2009: Sybase and SAP partner to deliver the SAP Business Suite software to iPhone, Windows Mobile, BlackBerry, and other devices.
- May 2009: Sybase begins packaging MicroStrategy business intelligence software with its Sybase IQ server.
- September 2009: Sybase and Verizon partner to manage mobility services for enterprises worldwide through Verizon's Managed Mobility Solutions, which uses Sybase's enterprise device management platform.
- May 2010: SAP and Sybase, Inc. announce that SAP America, Inc. has signed a definitive merger agreement to acquire Sybase, Inc. for all outstanding shares of Sybase common stock, representing an enterprise value of approximately $5.8 billion.
- July 2010: SAP announces it has completed the acquisition of Sybase, Inc., the latter now a wholly owned subsidiary of SAP America.
- October 2012: All of Sybase's employees are incorporated into SAP's workforce. On October 30, 2012, SAP announces that Sybase, Inc. President and CEO John S. Chen will be leaving Sybase effective the very next day (October 31, 2012) after leading Sybase for 15 years.

== See also ==
- Adaptive Server Enterprise
