= ISO/IEC 9075 =

SQL standard

ISO/IEC 9075 "Information technology - Database languages - SQL" is an international standard for Structured Query Language, and is considered as specifying the minimum for what a database engine should fulfill in terms of SQL syntax, which is called Core SQL. The standard also defines a number of optional features.

The standard is maintained by the ISO/IEC JTC 1/SC 32.

== History ==
The first edition was based on ANSI SQL.

== Parts ==
The SQL standard is divided in multiple parts. Some were never released or were merged into other parts.

- ISO/IEC 9075-1 - Framework
- ISO/IEC 9075-2 - Foundation
- ISO/IEC 9075-3 - Call-Level Interface (SQL/CLI)
- ISO/IEC 9075-4 - Persistent Stored Modules (SQL/PSM)
- ISO/IEC 9075-5 - Host Language Bindings
- ISO/IEC 9075-6 - Global Transaction Support (SQL/Transaction)
- ISO/IEC 9075-7 - SQL Temporal
- ISO/IEC 9075-8 - SQL Row Pattern Recognition (SQL/PR)
- ISO/IEC 9075-9 - Management of External Data (SQL/MED)
- ISO/IEC 9075-10 - Object Language Bindings (SQL/OLB)
- ISO/IEC 9075-11 - Information and Definition Schemas
- ISO/IEC 9075-12 - SQL Replication
- ISO/IEC 9075-13 - SQL/JRT
- ISO/IEC 9075-14 - SQL/XML
- ISO/IEC 9075-15 - SQL/MDA
- ISO/IEC 9075-16 - SQL/PGQ

== Editions ==
Chronological overview of the editions (which have the year of publication in their name):

- SQL-86 ANSI X3.135:1986
- SQL-87 ISO/IEC 9075:1987 - 1st edition, based on the ANSI standard
- SQL-89, ANSI X3.135-1989, ISO/IEC 9075:1989 - 2nd edition
- SQL-92, ANSI X3.135-1992, ISO/IEC 9075:1992 - 3rd edition
- SQL:1999, ISO/IEC 9075:1999 - 4th edition
- SQL:2003, ISO/IEC 9075:2003 - 5th edition
- SQL:2006, ISO/IEC 9075-14:2006 - (adds Part 14)
- SQL:2008, ISO/IEC 9075:2008 - 6th edition
- SQL:2011, ISO/IEC 9075:2011 - 7th edition
- SQL:2016, ISO/IEC 9075:2016 - 8th edition
- SQL:2019, ISO/IEC 9075-15:2019 - (adds Part 15)
- SQL:2023, ISO/IEC 9075:2023 - 9th edition

New editions of the ISO standard are published regularly.
