= SQLXML =

SQLXML may refer to:

- SQL/XML, extension to the SQL standard that specifies SQL-based extensions for using XML in conjunction with SQL
- SQLXML, a technology to support XML for Microsoft SQL Server 2000, being mostly deprecated (see Microsoft Data Access Components)
