= SQL:2016 =

2016 edition of the SQL standard

SQL:2016 or ISO/IEC 9075:2016 (under the general title "Information technology – Database languages – SQL") is the eighth revision of the ISO (1987) and ANSI (1986) standard for the SQL database query language. It was formally adopted in December 2016. The standard consists of 9 parts which are described in some detail in SQL. The next version is SQL:2023.

== New features ==
SQL:2016 introduced 44 new optional features. 22 of them belong to the JSON functionality, ten more are related to polymorphic table functions. The additions to the standard include:

- JSON: Functions to create JSON documents, to access parts of JSON documents and to check whether a string contains valid JSON data
- Row Pattern Recognition: Matching a sequence of rows against a regular expression pattern
- Date and time formatting and parsing
- LISTAGG: A function to transform values from a group of rows into a delimited string
- Polymorphic table functions: table functions without predefined return type
- New data type DECFLOAT
