= SQL:2006 =

2006 edition of the SQL standard

SQL:2006 or ISO/IEC 9075:2006 standard is a revision part 14 (ISO/IEC 9075-14:2006) of the ISO standard for the SQL database query language. It is not a revision of the complete SQL standard.

== New features ==
The standard includes extensions to part 14 (ISO/IEC 9075-14:2006). This part defines ways in which SQL can be used in conjunction with XML. It defines ways of importing and storing XML data in an SQL database, manipulating it within the database, and publishing both XML and conventional SQL-data in XML form. In addition, it enables applications to integrate into their SQL code the use of XQuery, the XML Query Language published by the World Wide Web Consortium (W3C), to concurrently access ordinary SQL-data and XML documents.

== See also ==
- SQL:2003
- SQL:2008
