= Raymond F. Boyce =

American computer scientist (1946–1974)

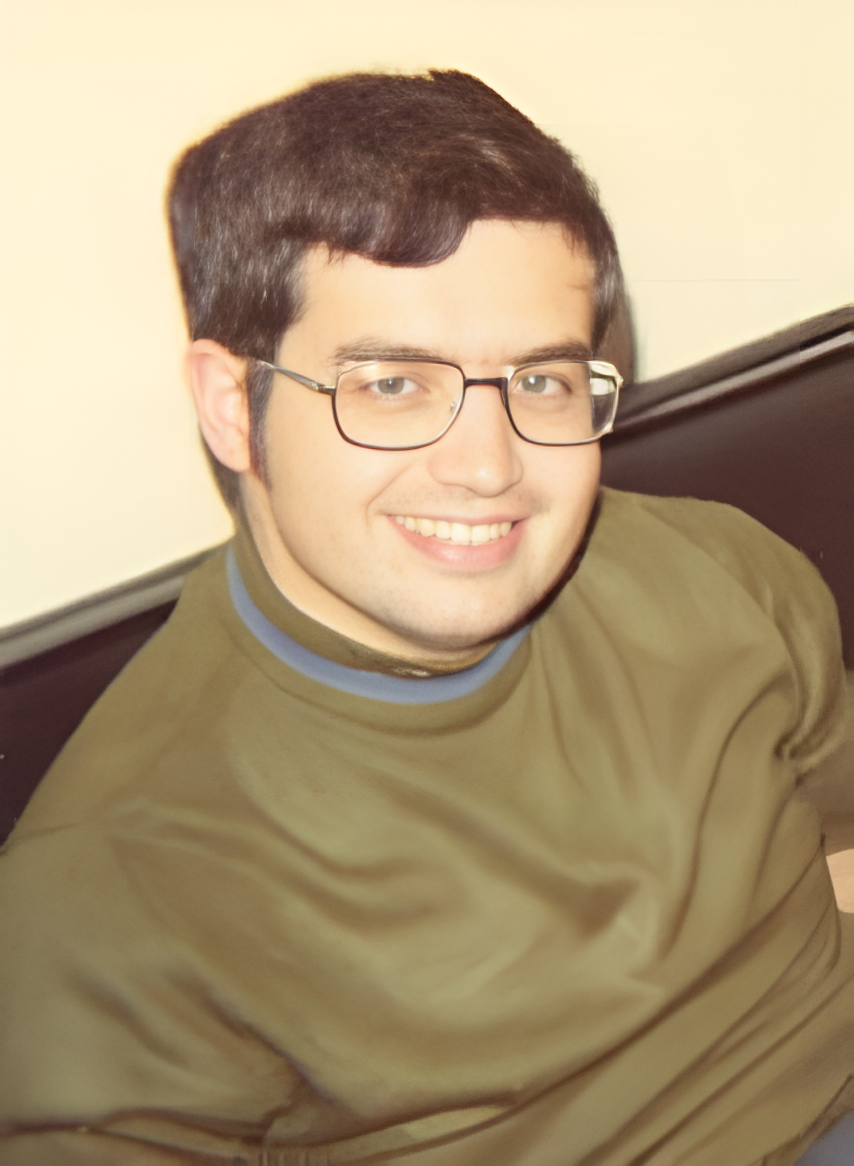
- Boyce, c. 1972
- Born: August 27, 1946; New York City, US
- Died: June 18, 1974 (aged 27); Santa Clara, California, US
- Education: Purdue University
- Known for: Relational model; SQL; Boyce–Codd normal form
- Spouse: Doris Ann Boyce
- Children: 1
- Scientific career
- Fields: Computer science
- Workplaces: IBM

Raymond Francis Boyce (August 27, 1946 – June 18, 1974) was an American computer scientist known for his research in relational databases. He is best known for his work co-developing the SQL database language and the Boyce-Codd normal form.

== Biography ==
Boyce was born in New York City on August 27, 1946. He attended Providence College, from which he graduated in 1968. He earned his PhD in computer science at Purdue in 1972. His wife was a nurse named Doris Ann (whence her nickname 'Sanndy'), whom he had met in college. After leaving Purdue, he worked on database projects for IBM in Yorktown Heights, New York. In the short period that he had, which was not quite two years long, he co-developed Boyce–Codd normal form. Together with Donald D. Chamberlin, he co-developed Structured Query Language (SQL) while managing the Relation Database development group for IBM in San Jose, California. He died on June 18, 1974, as a result of an aneurysm, leaving behind his wife Sanndy and his infant daughter Kristin.

== SQL ==
SQL was initially co-developed at IBM by Boyce alongside Donald D. Chamberlin in the early 1970s. Initially called SEQUEL (Structured English Query Language) and based on their original language called SQUARE (Specifying Queries As Relational Expressions). SEQUEL was designed to manipulate and retrieve data in relational databases. By 1974, Chamberlin and Boyce published “SEQUEL: A Structured English Query Language” which detailed their refinements to SQUARE and introduced the data retrieval aspects of SEQUEL. It was one of the first languages to use Edgar F. Codd's relational model. SEQUEL was later renamed to SQL by dropping the vowels, because SEQUEL was a trade mark registered by the Hawker Siddeley aircraft company. Today, SQL has become the most widely used relational database language.

== Boyce–Codd normal form ==
Boyce–Codd normal form (BCNF) was developed in 1974 by Boyce and Edgar F. Codd. It is a type of normal form that is used in database normalization. The goal of relational database design is to generate a set of database schemas that store information without unnecessary redundancy. Boyce-Codd accomplishes this and allows users to retrieve information easily. Using BCNF, databases will have all redundancy removed based on functional dependencies. It is a slightly stronger version of the third normal form.
