= List of SQL reserved words =

This list includes SQL reserved words – aka SQL reserved keywords, as the SQL:2023 specifies and some RDBMSs have added.

Reserved words in SQL and related products
Keyword	In SQL:2023	In IBM Db2 13	In Mimer SQL 11.0	In MySQL 8.0	In Oracle Database 23c	In PostgreSQL 17	In Microsoft SQL Server 2022	In Teradata 15
ABORT	—	—	—	—	—	—	—	Teradata
ABORTSESSION	—	—	—	—	—	—	—	Teradata
ABS	SQL-2023	—	—	—	—	—	—	Teradata
ABSENT	SQL-2023	—	—	—	—	—	—	—
ABSOLUTE	—	—	—	—	—	—	—	Teradata
ACCESS	—	—	—	—	Oracle	—	—	—
ACCESSIBLE	—	—	—	MySQL	—	—	—	—
ACCESS_LOCK	—	—	—	—	—	—	—	Teradata
ACCOUNT	—	—	—	—	—	—	—	Teradata
ACOS	SQL-2023	—	—	—	—	—	—	Teradata
ACOSH	—	—	—	—	—	—	—	Teradata
ACTION	—	—	—	—	—	—	—	Teradata
ADD	—	DB2	—	MySQL	Oracle	—	SQL Server	Teradata
ADD_MONTHS	—	—	—	—	—	—	—	Teradata
ADMIN	—	—	—	—	—	—	—	Teradata
AFTER	—	DB2	—	—	—	—	—	Teradata
AGGREGATE	—	—	—	—	—	—	—	Teradata
ALIAS	—	—	—	—	—	—	—	Teradata
ALL	SQL-2023	DB2	Mimer	MySQL	Oracle	PostgreSQL	SQL Server	Teradata
ALLOCATE	SQL-2023	DB2	Mimer	—	—	—	—	Teradata
ALLOW	—	DB2	—	—	—	—	—	—
ALTER	SQL-2023	—	Mimer	MySQL	Oracle	—	SQL Server	Teradata
ALTERAND	—	DB2	—	—	—	—	—	—
AMP	—	—	—	—	—	—	—	Teradata
ANALYSE	—	—	—	—	—	PostgreSQL	—	—
ANALYZE	—	—	—	MySQL	—	PostgreSQL	—	—
AND	SQL-2023	—	Mimer	MySQL	Oracle	PostgreSQL	SQL Server	Teradata
ANSIDATE	—	—	—	—	—	—	—	Teradata
ANY	SQL-2023	DB2	Mimer	—	Oracle	PostgreSQL	SQL Server	Teradata
ANY_VALUE	SQL-2023	—	—	—	—	—	—	—
ARE	SQL-2023	—	—	—	—	—	—	Teradata
ARRAY	SQL-2023	DB2	—	—	—	PostgreSQL	—	Teradata
ARRAY_AGG	SQL-2023	—	—	—	—	—	—	—
ARRAY_EXISTS	—	DB2	—	—	—	—	—	—
ARRAY_MAX_CARDINALITY	SQL-2023	—	—	—	—	—	—	—
AS	SQL-2023	DB2	Mimer	MySQL	Oracle	PostgreSQL	SQL Server	Teradata
ASC	—	—	—	MySQL	Oracle	PostgreSQL	SQL Server	Teradata
ASENSITIVE	SQL-2023	DB2	—	MySQL	—	—	—	—
ASIN	SQL-2023	—	—	—	—	—	—	Teradata
ASINH	—	—	—	—	—	—	—	Teradata
ASSERTION	—	—	—	—	—	—	—	Teradata
ASSOCIATE	—	DB2	—	—	—	—	—	—
ASUTIME	—	DB2	—	—	—	—	—	—
ASYMMETRIC	SQL-2023	—	Mimer	—	—	PostgreSQL	—	—
AT	SQL-2023	DB2	Mimer	—	—	—	—	Teradata
ATAN	SQL-2023	—	—	—	—	—	—	Teradata
ATAN2	—	—	—	—	—	—	—	Teradata
ATANH	—	—	—	—	—	—	—	Teradata
ATOMIC	SQL-2023	—	Mimer	—	—	—	—	Teradata
AUDIT	—	DB2	—	—	Oracle	—	—	—
AUTHORIZATION	SQL-2023	—	Mimer	—	—	PostgreSQL	SQL Server	Teradata
AUX	—	DB2	—	—	—	—	—	—
AUXILIARY	—	DB2	—	—	—	—	—	—
AVE	—	—	—	—	—	—	—	Teradata
AVERAGE	—	—	—	—	—	—	—	Teradata
AVG	SQL-2023	—	—	—	—	—	—	Teradata
BACKUP	—	—	—	—	—	—	SQL Server	—
BEFORE	—	DB2	—	MySQL	—	—	—	Teradata
BEGIN	SQL-2023	DB2	Mimer	—	—	—	SQL Server	Teradata
BEGIN_FRAME	SQL-2023	—	—	—	—	—	—	—
BEGIN_PARTITION	SQL-2023	—	—	—	—	—	—	—
BETWEEN	SQL-2023	DB2	Mimer	MySQL	Oracle	—	SQL Server	Teradata
BIGINT	SQL-2023	—	—	MySQL	—	—	—	—
BINARY	SQL-2023	—	—	MySQL	—	PostgreSQL	—	Teradata
BIT	—	—	—	—	—	—	—	Teradata
BLOB	SQL-2023	—	—	MySQL	—	—	—	Teradata
BOOLEAN	SQL-2023	—	—	—	—	—	—	Teradata
BOTH	SQL-2023	—	Mimer	MySQL	—	PostgreSQL	—	Teradata
BREADTH	—	—	—	—	—	—	—	Teradata
BREAK	—	—	—	—	—	—	SQL Server	—
BROWSE	—	—	—	—	—	—	SQL Server	—
BT	—	—	—	—	—	—	—	Teradata
BTRIM	SQL-2023	—	—	—	—	—	—	—
BUFFERPOOL	—	DB2	—	—	—	—	—	—
BULK	—	—	—	—	—	—	SQL Server	—
BUT	—	—	—	—	—	—	—	Teradata
BY	SQL-2023	DB2	Mimer	MySQL	Oracle	—	SQL Server	Teradata
BYTE	—	—	—	—	—	—	—	Teradata
BYTEINT	—	—	—	—	—	—	—	Teradata
BYTES	—	—	—	—	—	—	—	Teradata
CALL	SQL-2023	DB2	Mimer	MySQL	—	—	—	Teradata
CALLED	SQL-2023	—	Mimer	—	—	—	—	—
CAPTURE	—	DB2	—	—	—	—	—	—
CARDINALITY	SQL-2023	—	—	—	—	—	—	—
CASCADE	—	—	—	MySQL	—	—	SQL Server	Teradata
CASCADED	SQL-2023	DB2	—	—	—	—	—	Teradata
CASE	SQL-2023	DB2	Mimer	MySQL	—	PostgreSQL	SQL Server	Teradata
CASESPECIFIC	—	—	—	—	—	—	—	Teradata
CASE_N	—	—	—	—	—	—	—	Teradata
CAST	SQL-2023	DB2	Mimer	—	—	PostgreSQL	—	Teradata
CATALOG	—	—	—	—	—	—	—	Teradata
CCSID	—	DB2	—	—	—	—	—	—
CD	—	—	—	—	—	—	—	Teradata
CEIL	SQL-2023	—	—	—	—	—	—	—
CEILING	SQL-2023	—	—	—	—	—	—	—
CHANGE	—	—	—	MySQL	—	—	—	—
CHAR	SQL-2023	DB2	—	MySQL	Oracle	—	—	Teradata
CHAR2HEXINT	—	—	—	—	—	—	—	Teradata
CHARACTER	SQL-2023	DB2	—	MySQL	—	—	—	Teradata
CHARACTERS	—	—	—	—	—	—	—	Teradata
CHARACTER_LENGTH	SQL-2023	—	—	—	—	—	—	Teradata
CHARS	—	—	—	—	—	—	—	Teradata
CHAR_LENGTH	SQL-2023	—	—	—	—	—	—	Teradata
CHECK	SQL-2023	DB2	Mimer	MySQL	Oracle	PostgreSQL	SQL Server	Teradata
CHECKPOINT	—	—	—	—	—	—	SQL Server	Teradata
CLASS	—	—	—	—	—	—	—	Teradata
CLASSIFIER	SQL-2023	—	—	—	—	—	—	—
CLOB	SQL-2023	—	—	—	—	—	—	Teradata
CLONE	—	DB2	—	—	—	—	—	—
CLOSE	SQL-2023	DB2	Mimer	—	—	—	SQL Server	Teradata
CLUSTER	—	DB2	—	—	Oracle	—	—	Teradata
CLUSTERED	—	—	—	—	—	—	SQL Server	—
CM	—	—	—	—	—	—	—	Teradata
COALESCE	SQL-2023	—	—	—	—	—	SQL Server	Teradata
COLLATE	SQL-2023	—	Mimer	MySQL	—	PostgreSQL	SQL Server	Teradata
COLLATION	—	—	—	—	—	PostgreSQL	—	Teradata
COLLECT	SQL-2023	—	—	—	—	—	—	Teradata
COLLECTION	—	DB2	—	—	—	—	—	—
COLLID	—	DB2	—	—	—	—	—	—
COLUMN	SQL-2023	DB2	Mimer	MySQL	Oracle	PostgreSQL	SQL Server	Teradata
COLUMN_VALUE	—	—	—	—	Oracle	—	—	—
COMMENT	—	DB2	—	—	Oracle	—	—	Teradata
COMMIT	SQL-2023	DB2	Mimer	—	—	—	SQL Server	Teradata
COMPLETION	—	—	—	—	—	—	—	Teradata
COMPRESS	—	—	—	—	Oracle	—	—	Teradata
COMPUTE	—	—	—	—	—	—	SQL Server	—
CONCAT	—	DB2	—	—	—	—	—	—
CONCURRENTLY	—	—	—	—	—	PostgreSQL	—	—
CONDITION	SQL-2023	DB2	Mimer	MySQL	—	—	—	—
CONNECT	SQL-2023	DB2	Mimer	—	Oracle	—	—	Teradata
CONNECTION	—	DB2	—	—	—	—	—	Teradata
CONSTRAINT	SQL-2023	DB2	Mimer	MySQL	—	PostgreSQL	SQL Server	Teradata
CONSTRAINTS	—	—	—	—	—	—	—	Teradata
CONSTRUCTOR	—	—	—	—	—	—	—	Teradata
CONTAINS	SQL-2023	DB2	—	—	—	—	SQL Server	—
CONTAINSTABLE	—	—	—	—	—	—	SQL Server	—
CONTENT	—	DB2	—	—	—	—	—	—
CONTINUE	—	DB2	—	MySQL	—	—	SQL Server	Teradata
CONVERT	SQL-2023	—	—	MySQL	—	—	SQL Server	—
CONVERT_TABLE_HEADER	—	—	—	—	—	—	—	Teradata
COPY	SQL-2023	—	—	—	—	—	—	—
CORR	SQL-2023	—	—	—	—	—	—	Teradata
CORRESPONDING	SQL-2023	—	Mimer	—	—	—	—	Teradata
COS	SQL-2023	—	—	—	—	—	—	Teradata
COSH	SQL-2023	—	—	—	—	—	—	Teradata
COUNT	SQL-2023	—	—	—	—	—	—	Teradata
COVAR_POP	SQL-2023	—	—	—	—	—	—	Teradata
COVAR_SAMP	SQL-2023	—	—	—	—	—	—	Teradata
CREATE	SQL-2023	DB2	Mimer	MySQL	Oracle	PostgreSQL	SQL Server	Teradata
CROSS	SQL-2023	—	Mimer	MySQL	—	PostgreSQL	SQL Server	Teradata
CS	—	—	—	—	—	—	—	Teradata
CSUM	—	—	—	—	—	—	—	Teradata
CT	—	—	—	—	—	—	—	Teradata
CUBE	SQL-2023	DB2	—	MySQL	—	—	—	Teradata
CUME_DIST	SQL-2023	—	—	MySQL	—	—	—	—
CURRENT	SQL-2023	DB2	Mimer	—	Oracle	—	SQL Server	Teradata
CURRENT_CATALOG	SQL-2023	—	—	—	—	PostgreSQL	—	—
CURRENT_DATE	SQL-2023	DB2	Mimer	MySQL	—	PostgreSQL	SQL Server	Teradata
CURRENT_DEFAULT_TRANSFORM_GROUP	SQL-2023	—	—	—	—	—	—	—
CURRENT_LC_CTYPE	—	DB2	—	—	—	—	—	—
CURRENT_PATH	SQL-2023	DB2	Mimer	—	—	—	—	Teradata
CURRENT_ROLE	SQL-2023	—	—	—	—	PostgreSQL	—	Teradata
CURRENT_ROW	SQL-2023	—	—	—	—	—	—	—
CURRENT_SCHEMA	SQL-2023	DB2	—	—	—	PostgreSQL	—	—
CURRENT_SERVER	—	DB2	—	—	—	—	—	—
CURRENT_TIME	SQL-2023	DB2	Mimer	MySQL	—	PostgreSQL	SQL Server	Teradata
CURRENT_TIMESTAMP	SQL-2023	DB2	Mimer	MySQL	—	PostgreSQL	SQL Server	Teradata
CURRENT_TIMEZONE	—	DB2	—	—	—	—	—	—
CURRENT_TRANSFORM_GROUP_FOR_TYPE	SQL-2023	—	—	—	—	—	—	—
CURRENT_USER	SQL-2023	—	Mimer	MySQL	—	PostgreSQL	SQL Server	Teradata
CURRVAL	—	DB2	—	—	—	—	—	—
CURSOR	SQL-2023	DB2	Mimer	MySQL	—	—	SQL Server	Teradata
CV	—	—	—	—	—	—	—	Teradata
CYCLE	SQL-2023	—	—	—	—	—	—	Teradata
DATA	—	DB2	—	—	—	—	—	Teradata
DATABASE	—	DB2	—	MySQL	—	—	SQL Server	Teradata
DATABASES	—	—	—	MySQL	—	—	—	—
DATABLOCKSIZE	—	—	—	—	—	—	—	Teradata
DATE	SQL-2023	—	—	—	Oracle	—	—	Teradata
DATEFORM	—	—	—	—	—	—	—	Teradata
DAY	SQL-2023	DB2	Mimer	—	—	—	—	Teradata
DAYS	—	DB2	—	—	—	—	—	—
DAY_HOUR	—	—	—	MySQL	—	—	—	—
DAY_MICROSECOND	—	—	—	MySQL	—	—	—	—
DAY_MINUTE	—	—	—	MySQL	—	—	—	—
DAY_SECOND	—	—	—	MySQL	—	—	—	—
DBCC	—	—	—	—	—	—	SQL Server	—
DBINFO	—	DB2	—	—	—	—	—	—
DEALLOCATE	SQL-2023	—	Mimer	—	—	—	SQL Server	Teradata
DEC	SQL-2023	—	—	MySQL	—	—	—	Teradata
DECFLOAT	SQL-2023	—	—	—	—	—	—	—
DECIMAL	SQL-2023	—	—	MySQL	Oracle	—	—	Teradata
DECLARE	SQL-2023	DB2	Mimer	MySQL	—	—	SQL Server	Teradata
DEFAULT	SQL-2023	DB2	Mimer	MySQL	Oracle	PostgreSQL	SQL Server	Teradata
DEFERRABLE	—	—	—	—	—	PostgreSQL	—	Teradata
DEFERRED	—	—	—	—	—	—	—	Teradata
DEFINE	SQL-2023	—	—	—	—	—	—	—
DEGREES	—	—	—	—	—	—	—	Teradata
DEL	—	—	—	—	—	—	—	Teradata
DELAYED	—	—	—	MySQL	—	—	—	—
DELETE	SQL-2023	DB2	Mimer	MySQL	Oracle	—	SQL Server	Teradata
DENSE_RANK	SQL-2023	—	—	MySQL	—	—	—	—
DENY	—	—	—	—	—	—	SQL Server	—
DEPTH	—	—	—	—	—	—	—	Teradata
DEREF	SQL-2023	—	—	—	—	—	—	Teradata
DESC	—	—	—	MySQL	Oracle	PostgreSQL	SQL Server	Teradata
DESCRIBE	SQL-2023	—	Mimer	MySQL	—	—	—	Teradata
DESCRIPTOR	—	DB2	—	—	—	—	—	Teradata
DESTROY	—	—	—	—	—	—	—	Teradata
DESTRUCTOR	—	—	—	—	—	—	—	Teradata
DETERMINISTIC	SQL-2023	DB2	Mimer	MySQL	—	—	—	Teradata
DIAGNOSTIC	—	—	—	—	—	—	—	Teradata
DIAGNOSTICS	—	—	—	—	—	—	—	Teradata
DICTIONARY	—	—	—	—	—	—	—	Teradata
DISABLE	—	DB2	—	—	—	—	—	—
DISABLED	—	—	—	—	—	—	—	Teradata
DISALLOW	—	DB2	—	—	—	—	—	—
DISCONNECT	SQL-2023	—	Mimer	—	—	—	—	Teradata
DISK	—	—	—	—	—	—	SQL Server	—
DISTINCT	SQL-2023	DB2	Mimer	MySQL	Oracle	PostgreSQL	SQL Server	Teradata
DISTINCTROW	—	—	—	MySQL	—	—	—	—
DISTRIBUTED	—	—	—	—	—	—	SQL Server	—
DIV	—	—	—	MySQL	—	—	—	—
DO	SQL/PSM-2016	DB2	Mimer	—	—	PostgreSQL	—	Teradata
DOCUMENT	—	DB2	—	—	—	—	—	—
DOMAIN	—	—	—	—	—	—	—	Teradata
DOUBLE	SQL-2023	DB2	—	MySQL	—	—	SQL Server	Teradata
DROP	SQL-2023	DB2	Mimer	MySQL	Oracle	—	SQL Server	Teradata
DSSIZE	—	DB2	—	—	—	—	—	—
DUAL	—	—	—	MySQL	—	—	—	Teradata
DUMP	—	—	—	—	—	—	SQL Server	Teradata
DYNAMIC	SQL-2023	DB2	—	—	—	—	—	Teradata
EACH	SQL-2023	—	—	MySQL	—	—	—	Teradata
ECHO	—	—	—	—	—	—	—	Teradata
EDITPROC	—	DB2	—	—	—	—	—	—
ELEMENT	SQL-2023	—	—	—	—	—	—	—
ELSE	SQL-2023	DB2	Mimer	MySQL	Oracle	PostgreSQL	SQL Server	Teradata
ELSEIF	SQL/PSM-2016	DB2	Mimer	MySQL	—	—	—	Teradata
EMPTY	SQL-2023	—	—	MySQL	—	—	—	—
ENABLED	—	—	—	—	—	—	—	Teradata
ENCLOSED	—	—	—	MySQL	—	—	—	—
ENCODING	—	DB2	—	—	—	—	—	—
ENCRYPTION	—	DB2	—	—	—	—	—	—
END	SQL-2023	DB2	Mimer	—	—	PostgreSQL	SQL Server	Teradata
END-EXEC	SQL-2023	DB2	—	—	—	—	—	Teradata
ENDING	—	DB2	—	—	—	—	—	—
END_FRAME	SQL-2023	—	—	—	—	—	—	—
END_PARTITION	SQL-2023	—	—	—	—	—	—	—
EQ	—	—	—	—	—	—	—	Teradata
EQUALS	SQL-2023	—	—	—	—	—	—	Teradata
ERASE	—	DB2	—	—	—	—	—	—
ERRLVL	—	—	—	—	—	—	SQL Server	—
ERROR	—	—	—	—	—	—	—	Teradata
ERRORFILES	—	—	—	—	—	—	—	Teradata
ERRORTABLES	—	—	—	—	—	—	—	Teradata
ESCAPE	SQL-2023	DB2	Mimer	—	—	—	SQL Server	Teradata
ESCAPED	—	—	—	MySQL	—	—	—	—
ET	—	—	—	—	—	—	—	Teradata
EVERY	SQL-2023	—	—	—	—	—	—	Teradata
EXCEPT	SQL-2023	DB2	Mimer	MySQL	—	PostgreSQL	SQL Server	Teradata
EXCEPTION	—	DB2	—	—	—	—	—	Teradata
EXCLUSIVE	—	—	—	—	Oracle	—	—	—
EXEC	SQL-2023	—	—	—	—	—	SQL Server	Teradata
EXECUTE	SQL-2023	DB2	Mimer	—	—	—	SQL Server	Teradata
EXISTS	SQL-2023	DB2	Mimer	MySQL	Oracle	—	SQL Server	Teradata
EXIT	—	DB2	—	MySQL	—	—	SQL Server	Teradata
EXP	SQL-2023	—	—	—	—	—	—	Teradata
EXPLAIN	—	DB2	—	MySQL	—	—	—	Teradata
EXTERNAL	SQL-2023	DB2	Mimer	—	—	—	SQL Server	Teradata
EXTRACT	SQL-2023	—	—	—	—	—	—	Teradata
FALLBACK	—	—	—	—	—	—	—	Teradata
FALSE	SQL-2023	—	Mimer	MySQL	—	PostgreSQL	—	Teradata
FASTEXPORT	—	—	—	—	—	—	—	Teradata
FENCED	—	DB2	—	—	—	—	—	—
FETCH	SQL-2023	DB2	Mimer	MySQL	—	PostgreSQL	SQL Server	Teradata
FIELDPROC	—	DB2	—	—	—	—	—	—
FILE	—	—	—	—	Oracle	—	SQL Server	—
FILLFACTOR	—	—	—	—	—	—	SQL Server	—
FILTER	SQL-2023	—	—	—	—	—	—	—
FINAL	—	DB2	—	—	—	—	—	—
FIRST	—	DB2	Mimer	—	—	—	—	Teradata
FIRST_VALUE	SQL-2023	—	—	MySQL	—	—	—	—
FLOAT	SQL-2023	—	—	MySQL	Oracle	—	—	Teradata
FLOAT4	—	—	—	MySQL	—	—	—	—
FLOAT8	—	—	—	MySQL	—	—	—	—
FLOOR	SQL-2023	—	—	—	—	—	—	—
FOR	SQL-2023	DB2	Mimer	MySQL	Oracle	PostgreSQL	SQL Server	Teradata
FORCE	—	—	—	MySQL	—	—	—	—
FOREIGN	SQL-2023	—	Mimer	MySQL	—	PostgreSQL	SQL Server	Teradata
FORMAT	—	—	—	—	—	—	—	Teradata
FOUND	—	—	—	—	—	—	—	Teradata
FRAME_ROW	SQL-2023	—	—	—	—	—	—	—
FREE	SQL-2023	DB2	—	—	—	—	—	Teradata
FREESPACE	—	—	—	—	—	—	—	Teradata
FREETEXT	—	—	—	—	—	—	SQL Server	—
FREETEXTTABLE	—	—	—	—	—	—	SQL Server	—
FREEZE	—	—	—	—	—	PostgreSQL	—	—
FROM	SQL-2023	DB2	Mimer	MySQL	Oracle	PostgreSQL	SQL Server	Teradata
FULL	SQL-2023	DB2	Mimer	—	—	PostgreSQL	SQL Server	Teradata
FULLTEXT	—	—	—	MySQL	—	—	—	—
FUNCTION	SQL-2023	DB2	Mimer	MySQL	—	—	SQL Server	Teradata
FUSION	SQL-2023	—	—	—	—	—	—	—
GE	—	—	—	—	—	—	—	Teradata
GENERAL	—	—	—	—	—	—	—	Teradata
GENERATED	—	DB2	—	MySQL	—	—	—	Teradata
GET	SQL-2023	DB2	Mimer	MySQL	—	—	—	Teradata
GIVE	—	—	—	—	—	—	—	Teradata
GLOBAL	SQL-2023	DB2	Mimer	—	—	—	—	Teradata
GO	—	DB2	—	—	—	—	—	Teradata
GOTO	—	DB2	—	—	—	—	SQL Server	Teradata
GRANT	SQL-2023	DB2	Mimer	MySQL	Oracle	PostgreSQL	SQL Server	Teradata
GRAPHIC	—	—	—	—	—	—	—	Teradata
GREATEST	SQL-2023	—	—	—	—	—	—	—
GROUP	SQL-2023	DB2	Mimer	MySQL	Oracle	PostgreSQL	SQL Server	Teradata
GROUPING	SQL-2023	—	—	MySQL	—	—	—	Teradata
GROUPS	SQL-2023	—	—	MySQL	—	—	—	—
GT	—	—	—	—	—	—	—	Teradata
HANDLER	SQL/PSM-2016	DB2	Mimer	—	—	—	—	Teradata
HASH	—	—	—	—	—	—	—	Teradata
HASHAMP	—	—	—	—	—	—	—	Teradata
HASHBAKAMP	—	—	—	—	—	—	—	Teradata
HASHBUCKET	—	—	—	—	—	—	—	Teradata
HASHROW	—	—	—	—	—	—	—	Teradata
HAVING	SQL-2023	DB2	Mimer	MySQL	Oracle	PostgreSQL	SQL Server	Teradata
HELP	—	—	—	—	—	—	—	Teradata
HIGH_PRIORITY	—	—	—	MySQL	—	—	—	—
HOLD	SQL-2023	DB2	Mimer	—	—	—	—	—
HOLDLOCK	—	—	—	—	—	—	SQL Server	—
HOST	—	—	—	—	—	—	—	Teradata
HOUR	SQL-2023	DB2	Mimer	—	—	—	—	Teradata
HOURS	—	DB2	—	—	—	—	—	—
HOUR_MICROSECOND	—	—	—	MySQL	—	—	—	—
HOUR_MINUTE	—	—	—	MySQL	—	—	—	—
HOUR_SECOND	—	—	—	MySQL	—	—	—	—
IDENTIFIED	—	—	—	—	Oracle	—	—	—
IDENTITY	SQL-2023	—	Mimer	—	—	—	SQL Server	Teradata
IDENTITYCOL	—	—	—	—	—	—	SQL Server	—
IDENTITY_INSERT	—	—	—	—	—	—	SQL Server	—
IF	SQL/PSM-2016	DB2	Mimer	MySQL	—	—	SQL Server	Teradata
IGNORE	—	—	—	MySQL	—	—	—	Teradata
ILIKE	—	—	—	—	—	PostgreSQL	—	—
IMMEDIATE	—	DB2	—	—	Oracle	—	—	Teradata
IN	SQL-2023	DB2	Mimer	MySQL	Oracle	PostgreSQL	SQL Server	Teradata
INCLUSIVE	—	DB2	—	—	—	—	—	—
INCONSISTENT	—	—	—	—	—	—	—	Teradata
INCREMENT	—	—	—	—	Oracle	—	—	—
INDEX	—	DB2	—	MySQL	Oracle	—	SQL Server	Teradata
INDICATOR	SQL-2023	—	Mimer	—	—	—	—	Teradata
INFILE	—	—	—	MySQL	—	—	—	—
INHERIT	—	DB2	—	—	—	—	—	—
INITIAL	SQL-2023	—	—	—	Oracle	—	—	—
INITIALIZE	—	—	—	—	—	—	—	Teradata
INITIALLY	—	—	—	—	—	PostgreSQL	—	Teradata
INITIATE	—	—	—	—	—	—	—	Teradata
INNER	SQL-2023	DB2	Mimer	MySQL	—	PostgreSQL	SQL Server	Teradata
INOUT	SQL-2023	DB2	Mimer	MySQL	—	—	—	Teradata
INPUT	—	—	—	—	—	—	—	Teradata
INS	—	—	—	—	—	—	—	Teradata
INSENSITIVE	SQL-2023	DB2	—	MySQL	—	—	—	—
INSERT	SQL-2023	DB2	Mimer	MySQL	Oracle	—	SQL Server	Teradata
INSTEAD	—	—	—	—	—	—	—	Teradata
INT	SQL-2023	—	—	MySQL	—	—	—	Teradata
INT1	—	—	—	MySQL	—	—	—	—
INT2	—	—	—	MySQL	—	—	—	—
INT3	—	—	—	MySQL	—	—	—	—
INT4	—	—	—	MySQL	—	—	—	—
INT8	—	—	—	MySQL	—	—	—	—
INTEGER	SQL-2023	—	—	MySQL	Oracle	—	—	Teradata
INTEGERDATE	—	—	—	—	—	—	—	Teradata
INTERSECT	SQL-2023	DB2	Mimer	MySQL	Oracle	PostgreSQL	SQL Server	Teradata
INTERSECTION	SQL-2023	—	—	—	—	—	—	—
INTERVAL	SQL-2023	—	Mimer	MySQL	—	—	—	Teradata
INTO	SQL-2023	DB2	Mimer	MySQL	Oracle	PostgreSQL	SQL Server	Teradata
IO_AFTER_GTIDS	—	—	—	MySQL	—	—	—	—
IO_BEFORE_GTIDS	—	—	—	MySQL	—	—	—	—
IS	SQL-2023	DB2	Mimer	MySQL	Oracle	PostgreSQL	SQL Server	Teradata
ISNULL	—	—	—	—	—	PostgreSQL	—	—
ISOBID	—	DB2	—	—	—	—	—	—
ISOLATION	—	—	—	—	—	—	—	Teradata
ITERATE	SQL/PSM-2016	DB2	Mimer	MySQL	—	—	—	Teradata
JAR	—	DB2	—	—	—	—	—	—
JOIN	SQL-2023	DB2	Mimer	MySQL	—	PostgreSQL	SQL Server	Teradata
JOURNAL	—	—	—	—	—	—	—	Teradata
JSON	SQL-2023	—	—	—	—	—	—	—
JSON_ARRAY	SQL-2023	—	—	—	—	—	—	—
JSON_ARRAYAGG	SQL-2023	—	—	—	—	—	—	—
JSON_EXISTS	SQL-2023	—	—	—	—	—	—	—
JSON_OBJECT	SQL-2023	—	—	—	—	—	—	—
JSON_OBJECTAGG	SQL-2023	—	—	—	—	—	—	—
JSON_QUERY	SQL-2023	—	—	—	—	—	—	—
JSON_SCALAR	SQL-2023	—	—	—	—	—	—	—
JSON_SERIALIZE	SQL-2023	—	—	—	—	—	—	—
JSON_TABLE	SQL-2023	—	—	MySQL	—	—	—	—
JSON_TABLE_PRIMITIVE	SQL-2023	—	—	—	—	—	—	—
JSON_VALUE	SQL-2023	—	—	—	—	—	—	—
KEEP	—	DB2	—	—	—	—	—	—
KEY	—	DB2	—	MySQL	—	—	SQL Server	Teradata
KEYS	—	—	—	MySQL	—	—	—	—
KILL	—	—	—	MySQL	—	—	SQL Server	—
KURTOSIS	—	—	—	—	—	—	—	Teradata
LABEL	—	DB2	—	—	—	—	—	—
LAG	SQL-2023	—	—	MySQL	—	—	—	—
LANGUAGE	SQL-2023	DB2	Mimer	—	—	—	—	Teradata
LARGE	SQL-2023	—	Mimer	—	—	—	—	Teradata
LAST	—	DB2	—	—	—	—	—	Teradata
LAST_VALUE	SQL-2023	—	—	MySQL	—	—	—	—
LATERAL	SQL-2023	—	—	MySQL	—	PostgreSQL	—	Teradata
LC_CTYPE	—	DB2	—	—	—	—	—	—
LE	—	—	—	—	—	—	—	Teradata
LEAD	SQL-2023	—	—	MySQL	—	—	—	—
LEADING	SQL-2023	—	Mimer	MySQL	—	PostgreSQL	—	Teradata
LEAST	SQL-2023	—	—	—	—	—	—	—
LEAVE	SQL/PSM-2016	DB2	Mimer	MySQL	—	—	—	Teradata
LEFT	SQL-2023	DB2	Mimer	MySQL	—	PostgreSQL	SQL Server	Teradata
LESS	—	—	—	—	—	—	—	Teradata
LEVEL	—	—	—	—	Oracle	—	—	Teradata
LIKE	SQL-2023	DB2	Mimer	MySQL	Oracle	PostgreSQL	SQL Server	Teradata
LIKE_REGEX	SQL-2023	—	—	—	—	—	—	—
LIMIT	—	DB2	—	MySQL	—	PostgreSQL	—	Teradata
LINEAR	—	—	—	MySQL	—	—	—	—
LINENO	—	—	—	—	—	—	SQL Server	—
LINES	—	—	—	MySQL	—	—	—	—
LISTAGG	SQL-2023	—	—	—	—	—	—	—
LN	SQL-2023	—	—	—	—	—	—	Teradata
LOAD	—	—	—	MySQL	—	—	SQL Server	—
LOADING	—	—	—	—	—	—	—	Teradata
LOCAL	SQL-2023	DB2	Mimer	—	—	—	—	Teradata
LOCALE	—	DB2	—	—	—	—	—	—
LOCALTIME	SQL-2023	—	Mimer	MySQL	—	PostgreSQL	—	Teradata
LOCALTIMESTAMP	SQL-2023	—	Mimer	MySQL	—	PostgreSQL	—	Teradata
LOCATOR	—	DB2	—	—	—	—	—	Teradata
LOCATORS	—	DB2	—	—	—	—	—	—
LOCK	—	DB2	—	MySQL	Oracle	—	—	Teradata
LOCKING	—	—	—	—	—	—	—	Teradata
LOCKMAX	—	DB2	—	—	—	—	—	—
LOCKSIZE	—	DB2	—	—	—	—	—	—
LOG	SQL-2023	—	—	—	—	—	—	Teradata
LOG10	SQL-2023	—	—	—	—	—	—	—
LOGGING	—	—	—	—	—	—	—	Teradata
LOGON	—	—	—	—	—	—	—	Teradata
LONG	—	DB2	—	MySQL	Oracle	—	—	Teradata
LONGBLOB	—	—	—	MySQL	—	—	—	—
LONGTEXT	—	—	—	MySQL	—	—	—	—
LOOP	SQL/PSM-2016	DB2	Mimer	MySQL	—	—	—	Teradata
LOWER	SQL-2023	—	—	—	—	—	—	Teradata
LOW_PRIORITY	—	—	—	MySQL	—	—	—	—
LPAD	SQL-2023	—	—	—	—	—	—	—
LT	—	—	—	—	—	—	—	Teradata
LTRIM	SQL-2023	—	—	—	—	—	—	—
MACRO	—	—	—	—	—	—	—	Teradata
MAINTAINED	—	DB2	—	—	—	—	—	—
MAP	—	—	—	—	—	—	—	Teradata
MASTER_BIND	—	—	—	MySQL	—	—	—	—
MASTER_SSL_VERIFY_SERVER_CERT	—	—	—	MySQL	—	—	—	—
MATCH	SQL-2023	—	Mimer	MySQL	—	—	—	Teradata
MATCHES	SQL-2023	—	—	—	—	—	—	—
MATCH_NUMBER	SQL-2023	—	—	—	—	—	—	—
MATCH_RECOGNIZE	SQL-2023	—	—	—	—	—	—	—
MATERIALIZED	—	DB2	—	—	—	—	—	—
MAVG	—	—	—	—	—	—	—	Teradata
MAX	SQL-2023	—	—	—	—	—	—	Teradata
MAXEXTENTS	—	—	—	—	Oracle	—	—	—
MAXIMUM	—	—	—	—	—	—	—	Teradata
MAXVALUE	—	—	—	MySQL	—	—	—	—
MCHARACTERS	—	—	—	—	—	—	—	Teradata
MDIFF	—	—	—	—	—	—	—	Teradata
MEDIUMBLOB	—	—	—	MySQL	—	—	—	—
MEDIUMINT	—	—	—	MySQL	—	—	—	—
MEDIUMTEXT	—	—	—	MySQL	—	—	—	—
MEMBER	SQL-2023	—	Mimer	—	—	—	—	—
MERGE	SQL-2023	—	—	—	—	—	SQL Server	Teradata
METHOD	SQL-2023	—	Mimer	—	—	—	—	—
MICROSECOND	—	DB2	—	—	—	—	—	—
MICROSECONDS	—	DB2	—	—	—	—	—	—
MIDDLEINT	—	—	—	MySQL	—	—	—	—
MIN	SQL-2023	—	—	—	—	—	—	Teradata
MINDEX	—	—	—	—	—	—	—	Teradata
MINIMUM	—	—	—	—	—	—	—	Teradata
MINUS	—	—	—	—	Oracle	—	—	Teradata
MINUTE	SQL-2023	DB2	Mimer	—	—	—	—	Teradata
MINUTES	—	DB2	—	—	—	—	—	—
MINUTE_MICROSECOND	—	—	—	MySQL	—	—	—	—
MINUTE_SECOND	—	—	—	MySQL	—	—	—	—
MLINREG	—	—	—	—	—	—	—	Teradata
MLOAD	—	—	—	—	—	—	—	Teradata
MLSLABEL	—	—	—	—	Oracle	—	—	—
MOD	SQL-2023	—	—	MySQL	—	—	—	Teradata
MODE	—	—	—	—	Oracle	—	—	Teradata
MODIFIES	SQL-2023	DB2	Mimer	MySQL	—	—	—	Teradata
MODIFY	—	—	—	—	Oracle	—	—	Teradata
MODULE	SQL-2023	—	Mimer	—	—	—	—	Teradata
MONITOR	—	—	—	—	—	—	—	Teradata
MONRESOURCE	—	—	—	—	—	—	—	Teradata
MONSESSION	—	—	—	—	—	—	—	Teradata
MONTH	SQL-2023	DB2	Mimer	—	—	—	—	Teradata
MONTHS	—	DB2	—	—	—	—	—	—
MSUBSTR	—	—	—	—	—	—	—	Teradata
MSUM	—	—	—	—	—	—	—	Teradata
MULTISET	SQL-2023	—	—	—	—	—	—	Teradata
NAMED	—	—	—	—	—	—	—	Teradata
NAMES	—	—	—	—	—	—	—	Teradata
NATIONAL	SQL-2023	—	Mimer	—	—	—	SQL Server	Teradata
NATURAL	SQL-2023	—	Mimer	MySQL	—	PostgreSQL	—	Teradata
NCHAR	SQL-2023	—	—	—	—	—	—	Teradata
NCLOB	SQL-2023	—	—	—	—	—	—	Teradata
NE	—	—	—	—	—	—	—	Teradata
NESTED_TABLE_ID	—	—	—	—	Oracle	—	—	—
NEW	SQL-2023	—	Mimer	—	—	—	—	Teradata
NEW_TABLE	—	—	—	—	—	—	—	Teradata
NEXT	—	DB2	Mimer	—	—	—	—	Teradata
NEXTVAL	—	DB2	—	—	—	—	—	—
NO	SQL-2023	DB2	Mimer	—	—	—	—	Teradata
NOAUDIT	—	—	—	—	Oracle	—	—	—
NOCHECK	—	—	—	—	—	—	SQL Server	—
NOCOMPRESS	—	—	—	—	Oracle	—	—	—
NONCLUSTERED	—	—	—	—	—	—	SQL Server	—
NONE	SQL-2023	DB2	—	—	—	—	—	Teradata
NORMALIZE	SQL-2023	—	—	—	—	—	—	—
NOT	SQL-2023	DB2	Mimer	MySQL	Oracle	PostgreSQL	SQL Server	Teradata
NOTNULL	—	—	—	—	—	PostgreSQL	—	—
NOWAIT	—	—	—	—	Oracle	—	—	Teradata
NO_WRITE_TO_BINLOG	—	—	—	MySQL	—	—	—	—
NTH_VALUE	SQL-2023	—	—	MySQL	—	—	—	—
NTILE	SQL-2023	—	—	MySQL	—	—	—	—
NULL	SQL-2023	DB2	Mimer	MySQL	Oracle	PostgreSQL	SQL Server	Teradata
NULLIF	SQL-2023	—	—	—	—	—	SQL Server	Teradata
NULLIFZERO	—	—	—	—	—	—	—	Teradata
NULLS	—	DB2	—	—	—	—	—	—
NUMBER	—	—	—	—	Oracle	—	—	—
NUMERIC	SQL-2023	—	—	MySQL	—	—	—	Teradata
NUMPARTS	—	DB2	—	—	—	—	—	—
OBID	—	DB2	—	—	—	—	—	—
OBJECT	—	—	—	—	—	—	—	Teradata
OBJECTS	—	—	—	—	—	—	—	Teradata
OCCURRENCES_REGEX	SQL-2023	—	—	—	—	—	—	—
OCTET_LENGTH	SQL-2023	—	—	—	—	—	—	Teradata
OF	SQL-2023	DB2	Mimer	MySQL	Oracle	—	SQL Server	Teradata
OFF	—	—	—	—	—	—	SQL Server	Teradata
OFFLINE	—	—	—	—	Oracle	—	—	—
OFFSET	SQL-2023	DB2	Mimer	—	—	PostgreSQL	—	—
OFFSETS	—	—	—	—	—	—	SQL Server	—
OLD	SQL-2023	DB2	Mimer	—	—	—	—	Teradata
OLD_TABLE	—	—	—	—	—	—	—	Teradata
OMIT	SQL-2023	—	—	—	—	—	—	—
ON	SQL-2023	DB2	Mimer	MySQL	Oracle	PostgreSQL	SQL Server	Teradata
ONE	SQL-2023	—	—	—	—	—	—	—
ONLINE	—	—	—	—	Oracle	—	—	—
ONLY	SQL-2023	—	—	—	—	PostgreSQL	—	Teradata
OPEN	SQL-2023	DB2	Mimer	—	—	—	SQL Server	Teradata
OPENDATASOURCE	—	—	—	—	—	—	SQL Server	—
OPENQUERY	—	—	—	—	—	—	SQL Server	—
OPENROWSET	—	—	—	—	—	—	SQL Server	—
OPENXML	—	—	—	—	—	—	SQL Server	—
OPERATION	—	—	—	—	—	—	—	Teradata
OPTIMIZATION	—	DB2	—	—	—	—	—	—
OPTIMIZE	—	DB2	—	MySQL	—	—	—	—
OPTIMIZER_COSTS	—	—	—	MySQL	—	—	—	—
OPTION	—	—	—	MySQL	Oracle	—	SQL Server	Teradata
OPTIONALLY	—	—	—	MySQL	—	—	—	—
OR	SQL-2023	DB2	Mimer	MySQL	Oracle	PostgreSQL	SQL Server	Teradata
ORDER	SQL-2023	DB2	Mimer	MySQL	Oracle	PostgreSQL	SQL Server	Teradata
ORDINALITY	—	—	—	—	—	—	—	Teradata
ORGANIZATION	—	DB2	—	—	—	—	—	—
OUT	SQL-2023	DB2	Mimer	MySQL	—	—	—	Teradata
OUTER	SQL-2023	DB2	—	MySQL	—	PostgreSQL	SQL Server	Teradata
OUTFILE	—	—	—	MySQL	—	—	—	—
OUTPUT	—	—	—	—	—	—	—	Teradata
OVER	SQL-2023	—	—	MySQL	—	—	SQL Server	Teradata
OVERLAPS	SQL-2023	—	Mimer	—	—	PostgreSQL	—	Teradata
OVERLAY	SQL-2023	—	—	—	—	—	—	—
OVERRIDE	—	—	—	—	—	—	—	Teradata
PACKAGE	—	DB2	—	—	—	—	—	—
PAD	—	—	—	—	—	—	—	Teradata
PADDED	—	DB2	—	—	—	—	—	—
PARAMETER	SQL-2023	DB2	Mimer	—	—	—	—	Teradata
PARAMETERS	—	—	—	—	—	—	—	Teradata
PART	—	DB2	—	—	—	—	—	—
PARTIAL	—	—	—	—	—	—	—	Teradata
PARTITION	SQL-2023	DB2	—	MySQL	—	—	—	—
PARTITIONED	—	DB2	—	—	—	—	—	—
PARTITIONING	—	DB2	—	—	—	—	—	—
PASSWORD	—	—	—	—	—	—	—	Teradata
PATH	—	DB2	—	—	—	—	—	Teradata
PATTERN	SQL-2023	—	—	—	—	—	—	—
PCTFREE	—	—	—	—	Oracle	—	—	—
PER	SQL-2023	—	—	—	—	—	—	—
PERCENT	SQL-2023	—	—	—	—	—	SQL Server	Teradata
PERCENTILE_CONT	SQL-2023	—	—	—	—	—	—	—
PERCENTILE_DISC	SQL-2023	—	—	—	—	—	—	—
PERCENT_RANK	SQL-2023	—	—	MySQL	—	—	—	Teradata
PERIOD	SQL-2023	DB2	—	—	—	—	—	—
PERM	—	—	—	—	—	—	—	Teradata
PERMANENT	—	—	—	—	—	—	—	Teradata
PIECESIZE	—	DB2	—	—	—	—	—	—
PIVOT	—	—	—	—	—	—	SQL Server	—
PLACING	—	—	—	—	—	PostgreSQL	—	—
PLAN	—	DB2	—	—	—	—	SQL Server	—
PORTION	SQL-2023	—	—	—	—	—	—	—
POSITION	SQL-2023	—	—	—	—	—	—	Teradata
POSITION_REGEX	SQL-2023	—	—	—	—	—	—	—
POSTFIX	—	—	—	—	—	—	—	Teradata
POWER	SQL-2023	—	—	—	—	—	—	—
PRECEDES	SQL-2023	—	—	—	—	—	—	—
PRECISION	SQL-2023	DB2	Mimer	MySQL	—	—	SQL Server	Teradata
PREFIX	—	—	—	—	—	—	—	Teradata
PREORDER	—	—	—	—	—	—	—	Teradata
PREPARE	SQL-2023	DB2	Mimer	—	—	—	—	Teradata
PRESERVE	—	—	—	—	—	—	—	Teradata
PREVVAL	—	DB2	—	—	—	—	—	—
PRIMARY	SQL-2023	—	Mimer	MySQL	—	PostgreSQL	SQL Server	Teradata
PRINT	—	—	—	—	—	—	SQL Server	—
PRIOR	—	DB2	—	—	Oracle	—	—	Teradata
PRIQTY	—	DB2	—	—	—	—	—	—
PRIVATE	—	—	—	—	—	—	—	Teradata
PRIVILEGES	—	DB2	—	—	—	—	—	Teradata
PROC	—	—	—	—	—	—	SQL Server	—
PROCEDURE	SQL-2023	DB2	Mimer	MySQL	—	—	SQL Server	Teradata
PROFILE	—	—	—	—	—	—	—	Teradata
PROGRAM	—	DB2	—	—	—	—	—	—
PROPORTIONAL	—	—	—	—	—	—	—	Teradata
PROTECTION	—	—	—	—	—	—	—	Teradata
PSID	—	DB2	—	—	—	—	—	—
PTF	SQL-2023	—	—	—	—	—	—	—
PUBLIC	—	DB2	—	—	Oracle	—	SQL Server	Teradata
PURGE	—	—	—	MySQL	—	—	—	—
QUALIFIED	—	—	—	—	—	—	—	Teradata
QUALIFY	—	—	—	—	—	—	—	Teradata
QUANTILE	—	—	—	—	—	—	—	Teradata
QUERY	—	DB2	—	—	—	—	—	—
QUERYNO	—	DB2	—	—	—	—	—	—
RADIANS	—	—	—	—	—	—	—	Teradata
RAISERROR	—	—	—	—	—	—	SQL Server	—
RANDOM	—	—	—	—	—	—	—	Teradata
RANGE	SQL-2023	—	—	MySQL	—	—	—	—
RANGE_N	—	—	—	—	—	—	—	Teradata
RANK	SQL-2023	—	—	MySQL	—	—	—	Teradata
RAW	—	—	—	—	Oracle	—	—	—
READ	—	—	—	MySQL	—	—	SQL Server	Teradata
READS	SQL-2023	DB2	Mimer	MySQL	—	—	—	Teradata
READTEXT	—	—	—	—	—	—	SQL Server	—
READ_WRITE	—	—	—	MySQL	—	—	—	—
REAL	SQL-2023	—	—	MySQL	—	—	—	Teradata
RECONFIGURE	—	—	—	—	—	—	SQL Server	—
RECURSIVE	SQL-2023	—	Mimer	MySQL	—	—	—	Teradata
REF	SQL-2023	—	—	—	—	—	—	Teradata
REFERENCES	SQL-2023	DB2	Mimer	MySQL	—	PostgreSQL	SQL Server	Teradata
REFERENCING	SQL-2023	—	Mimer	—	—	—	—	Teradata
REFRESH	—	DB2	—	—	—	—	—	—
REGEXP	—	—	—	MySQL	—	—	—	—
REGR_AVGX	SQL-2023	—	—	—	—	—	—	Teradata
REGR_AVGY	SQL-2023	—	—	—	—	—	—	Teradata
REGR_COUNT	SQL-2023	—	—	—	—	—	—	Teradata
REGR_INTERCEPT	SQL-2023	—	—	—	—	—	—	Teradata
REGR_R2	SQL-2023	—	—	—	—	—	—	Teradata
REGR_SLOPE	SQL-2023	—	—	—	—	—	—	Teradata
REGR_SXX	SQL-2023	—	—	—	—	—	—	Teradata
REGR_SXY	SQL-2023	—	—	—	—	—	—	Teradata
REGR_SYY	SQL-2023	—	—	—	—	—	—	Teradata
RELATIVE	—	—	—	—	—	—	—	Teradata
RELEASE	SQL-2023	DB2	Mimer	MySQL	—	—	—	Teradata
RENAME	—	DB2	—	MySQL	Oracle	—	—	Teradata
REPEAT	SQL/PSM-2016	DB2	Mimer	MySQL	—	—	—	Teradata
REPLACE	—	—	—	MySQL	—	—	—	Teradata
REPLICATION	—	—	—	—	—	—	SQL Server	Teradata
REPOVERRIDE	—	—	—	—	—	—	—	Teradata
REQUEST	—	—	—	—	—	—	—	Teradata
REQUIRE	—	—	—	MySQL	—	—	—	—
RESIGNAL	SQL/PSM-2016	DB2	Mimer	MySQL	—	—	—	—
RESOURCE	—	—	—	—	Oracle	—	—	—
RESTART	—	—	—	—	—	—	—	Teradata
RESTORE	—	—	—	—	—	—	SQL Server	Teradata
RESTRICT	—	DB2	—	MySQL	—	—	SQL Server	Teradata
RESULT	SQL-2023	DB2	Mimer	—	—	—	—	Teradata
RESULT_SET_LOCATOR	—	DB2	—	—	—	—	—	—
RESUME	—	—	—	—	—	—	—	Teradata
RET	—	—	—	—	—	—	—	Teradata
RETRIEVE	—	—	—	—	—	—	—	Teradata
RETURN	SQL-2023	DB2	Mimer	MySQL	—	—	SQL Server	Teradata
RETURNING	—	—	—	—	—	PostgreSQL	—	—
RETURNS	SQL-2023	DB2	Mimer	—	—	—	—	Teradata
REVALIDATE	—	—	—	—	—	—	—	Teradata
REVERT	—	—	—	—	—	—	SQL Server	—
REVOKE	SQL-2023	DB2	Mimer	MySQL	Oracle	—	SQL Server	Teradata
RIGHT	SQL-2023	DB2	Mimer	MySQL	—	PostgreSQL	SQL Server	Teradata
RIGHTS	—	—	—	—	—	—	—	Teradata
RLIKE	—	—	—	MySQL	—	—	—	—
ROLE	—	DB2	—	—	—	—	—	Teradata
ROLLBACK	SQL-2023	DB2	Mimer	—	—	—	SQL Server	Teradata
ROLLFORWARD	—	—	—	—	—	—	—	Teradata
ROLLUP	SQL-2023	DB2	—	—	—	—	—	Teradata
ROUND_CEILING	—	DB2	—	—	—	—	—	—
ROUND_DOWN	—	DB2	—	—	—	—	—	—
ROUND_FLOOR	—	DB2	—	—	—	—	—	—
ROUND_HALF_DOWN	—	DB2	—	—	—	—	—	—
ROUND_HALF_EVEN	—	DB2	—	—	—	—	—	—
ROUND_HALF_UP	—	DB2	—	—	—	—	—	—
ROUND_UP	—	DB2	—	—	—	—	—	—
ROUTINE	—	—	—	—	—	—	—	Teradata
ROW	SQL-2023	DB2	Mimer	MySQL	Oracle	—	—	Teradata
ROWCOUNT	—	—	—	—	—	—	SQL Server	—
ROWGUIDCOL	—	—	—	—	—	—	SQL Server	—
ROWID	—	—	—	—	Oracle	—	—	Teradata
ROWNUM	—	—	—	—	Oracle	—	—	—
ROWS	SQL-2023	—	Mimer	MySQL	Oracle	—	—	Teradata
ROWSET	—	DB2	—	—	—	—	—	—
ROW_NUMBER	SQL-2023	—	—	MySQL	—	—	—	Teradata
RPAD	SQL-2023	—	—	—	—	—	—	—
RTRIM	SQL-2023	—	—	—	—	—	—	—
RULE	—	—	—	—	—	—	SQL Server	—
RUN	—	DB2	—	—	—	—	—	—
RUNNING	SQL-2023	—	—	—	—	—	—	—
SAMPLE	—	—	—	—	—	—	—	Teradata
SAMPLEID	—	—	—	—	—	—	—	Teradata
SAVE	—	—	—	—	—	—	SQL Server	—
SAVEPOINT	SQL-2023	DB2	—	—	—	—	—	Teradata
SCHEMA	—	DB2	—	MySQL	—	—	SQL Server	Teradata
SCHEMAS	—	—	—	MySQL	—	—	—	—
SCOPE	SQL-2023	—	—	—	—	—	—	Teradata
SCRATCHPAD	—	DB2	—	—	—	—	—	—
SCROLL	SQL-2023	—	Mimer	—	—	—	—	Teradata
SEARCH	SQL-2023	—	—	—	—	—	—	Teradata
SECOND	SQL-2023	DB2	Mimer	—	—	—	—	Teradata
SECONDS	—	DB2	—	—	—	—	—	—
SECOND_MICROSECOND	—	—	—	MySQL	—	—	—	—
SECQTY	—	DB2	—	—	—	—	—	—
SECTION	—	—	—	—	—	—	—	Teradata
SECURITY	—	DB2	—	—	—	—	—	—
SECURITYAUDIT	—	—	—	—	—	—	SQL Server	—
SEEK	SQL-2023	—	—	—	—	—	—	—
SEL	—	—	—	—	—	—	—	Teradata
SELECT	SQL-2023	DB2	Mimer	MySQL	Oracle	PostgreSQL	SQL Server	Teradata
SEMANTICKEYPHRASETABLE	—	—	—	—	—	—	SQL Server	—
SEMANTICSIMILARITYDETAILSTABLE	—	—	—	—	—	—	SQL Server	—
SEMANTICSIMILARITYTABLE	—	—	—	—	—	—	SQL Server	—
SENSITIVE	SQL-2023	DB2	—	MySQL	—	—	—	—
SEPARATOR	—	—	—	MySQL	—	—	—	—
SEQUENCE	—	DB2	—	—	—	—	—	Teradata
SESSION	—	—	—	—	Oracle	—	—	Teradata
SESSION_USER	SQL-2023	DB2	Mimer	—	—	PostgreSQL	SQL Server	Teradata
SET	SQL-2023	DB2	Mimer	MySQL	Oracle	PostgreSQL	SQL Server	Teradata
SETRESRATE	—	—	—	—	—	—	—	Teradata
SETS	—	—	—	—	—	—	—	Teradata
SETSESSRATE	—	—	—	—	—	—	—	Teradata
SETUSER	—	—	—	—	—	—	SQL Server	—
SHARE	—	—	—	—	Oracle	—	—	—
SHOW	SQL-2023	—	—	MySQL	—	—	—	Teradata
SHUTDOWN	—	—	—	—	—	—	SQL Server	—
SIGNAL	SQL/PSM-2016	DB2	Mimer	MySQL	—	—	—	—
SIMILAR	SQL-2023	—	—	—	—	PostgreSQL	—	—
SIMPLE	—	DB2	—	—	—	—	—	—
SIN	SQL-2023	—	—	—	—	—	—	Teradata
SINH	SQL-2023	—	—	—	—	—	—	Teradata
SIZE	—	—	—	—	Oracle	—	—	Teradata
SKEW	—	—	—	—	—	—	—	Teradata
SKIP	SQL-2023	—	—	—	—	—	—	—
SMALLINT	SQL-2023	—	—	MySQL	Oracle	—	—	Teradata
SOME	SQL-2023	DB2	Mimer	—	—	PostgreSQL	SQL Server	Teradata
SOUNDEX	—	—	—	—	—	—	—	Teradata
SOURCE	—	DB2	—	—	—	—	—	—
SPACE	—	—	—	—	—	—	—	Teradata
SPATIAL	—	—	—	MySQL	—	—	—	—
SPECIFIC	SQL-2023	DB2	Mimer	MySQL	—	—	—	Teradata
SPECIFICTYPE	SQL-2023	—	—	—	—	—	—	Teradata
SPOOL	—	—	—	—	—	—	—	Teradata
SQL	SQL-2023	—	Mimer	MySQL	—	—	—	Teradata
SQLEXCEPTION	SQL-2023	—	Mimer	MySQL	—	—	—	Teradata
SQLSTATE	SQL-2023	—	Mimer	MySQL	—	—	—	Teradata
SQLTEXT	—	—	—	—	—	—	—	Teradata
SQLWARNING	SQL-2023	—	Mimer	MySQL	—	—	—	Teradata
SQL_BIG_RESULT	—	—	—	MySQL	—	—	—	—
SQL_CALC_FOUND_ROWS	—	—	—	MySQL	—	—	—	—
SQL_SMALL_RESULT	—	—	—	MySQL	—	—	—	—
SQRT	SQL-2023	—	—	—	—	—	—	Teradata
SS	—	—	—	—	—	—	—	Teradata
SSL	—	—	—	MySQL	—	—	—	—
STANDARD	—	DB2	—	—	—	—	—	—
START	SQL-2023	—	Mimer	—	Oracle	—	—	Teradata
STARTING	—	—	—	MySQL	—	—	—	—
STARTUP	—	—	—	—	—	—	—	Teradata
STATE	—	—	—	—	—	—	—	Teradata
STATEMENT	—	DB2	—	—	—	—	—	Teradata
STATIC	SQL-2023	DB2	Mimer	—	—	—	—	Teradata
STATISTICS	—	—	—	—	—	—	SQL Server	Teradata
STAY	—	DB2	—	—	—	—	—	—
STDDEV_POP	SQL-2023	—	—	—	—	—	—	Teradata
STDDEV_SAMP	SQL-2023	—	—	—	—	—	—	Teradata
STEPINFO	—	—	—	—	—	—	—	Teradata
STOGROUP	—	DB2	—	—	—	—	—	—
STORED	—	—	—	MySQL	—	—	—	—
STORES	—	DB2	—	—	—	—	—	—
STRAIGHT_JOIN	—	—	—	MySQL	—	—	—	—
STRING_CS	—	—	—	—	—	—	—	Teradata
STRUCTURE	—	—	—	—	—	—	—	Teradata
STYLE	—	DB2	—	—	—	—	—	—
SUBMULTISET	SQL-2023	—	—	—	—	—	—	—
SUBSCRIBER	—	—	—	—	—	—	—	Teradata
SUBSET	SQL-2023	—	—	—	—	—	—	—
SUBSTR	—	—	—	—	—	—	—	Teradata
SUBSTRING	SQL-2023	—	—	—	—	—	—	Teradata
SUBSTRING_REGEX	SQL-2023	—	—	—	—	—	—	—
SUCCEEDS	SQL-2023	—	—	—	—	—	—	—
SUCCESSFUL	—	—	—	—	Oracle	—	—	—
SUM	SQL-2023	—	—	—	—	—	—	Teradata
SUMMARY	—	DB2	—	—	—	—	—	Teradata
SUSPEND	—	—	—	—	—	—	—	Teradata
SYMMETRIC	SQL-2023	—	Mimer	—	—	PostgreSQL	—	—
SYNONYM	—	DB2	—	—	Oracle	—	—	—
SYSDATE	—	DB2	—	—	Oracle	—	—	—
SYSTEM	SQL-2023	DB2	—	MySQL	—	—	—	—
SYSTEM_TIME	SQL-2023	—	—	—	—	—	—	—
SYSTEM_USER	SQL-2023	—	Mimer	—	—	PostgreSQL	SQL Server	Teradata
SYSTIMESTAMP	—	DB2	—	—	—	—	—	—
TABLE	SQL-2023	DB2	Mimer	MySQL	Oracle	PostgreSQL	SQL Server	Teradata
TABLESAMPLE	SQL-2023	—	—	—	—	PostgreSQL	SQL Server	—
TABLESPACE	—	DB2	—	—	—	—	—	—
TAN	SQL-2023	—	—	—	—	—	—	Teradata
TANH	SQL-2023	—	—	—	—	—	—	Teradata
TBL_CS	—	—	—	—	—	—	—	Teradata
TEMPORARY	—	—	—	—	—	—	—	Teradata
TERMINATE	—	—	—	—	—	—	—	Teradata
TERMINATED	—	—	—	MySQL	—	—	—	—
TEXTSIZE	—	—	—	—	—	—	SQL Server	—
THAN	—	—	—	—	—	—	—	Teradata
THEN	SQL-2023	DB2	Mimer	MySQL	Oracle	PostgreSQL	SQL Server	Teradata
THRESHOLD	—	—	—	—	—	—	—	Teradata
TIME	SQL-2023	—	—	—	—	—	—	Teradata
TIMESTAMP	SQL-2023	—	—	—	—	—	—	Teradata
TIMEZONE_HOUR	SQL-2023	—	Mimer	—	—	—	—	Teradata
TIMEZONE_MINUTE	SQL-2023	—	Mimer	—	—	—	—	Teradata
TINYBLOB	—	—	—	MySQL	—	—	—	—
TINYINT	—	—	—	MySQL	—	—	—	—
TINYTEXT	—	—	—	MySQL	—	—	—	—
TITLE	—	—	—	—	—	—	—	Teradata
TO	SQL-2023	DB2	Mimer	MySQL	Oracle	PostgreSQL	SQL Server	Teradata
TOP	—	—	—	—	—	—	SQL Server	—
TRACE	—	—	—	—	—	—	—	Teradata
TRAILING	SQL-2023	—	Mimer	MySQL	—	PostgreSQL	—	Teradata
TRAN	—	—	—	—	—	—	SQL Server	—
TRANSACTION	—	—	—	—	—	—	SQL Server	Teradata
TRANSLATE	SQL-2023	—	—	—	—	—	—	Teradata
TRANSLATE_CHK	—	—	—	—	—	—	—	Teradata
TRANSLATE_REGEX	SQL-2023	—	—	—	—	—	—	—
TRANSLATION	SQL-2023	—	—	—	—	—	—	Teradata
TREAT	SQL-2023	—	Mimer	—	—	—	—	Teradata
TRIGGER	SQL-2023	DB2	Mimer	MySQL	Oracle	—	SQL Server	Teradata
TRIM	SQL-2023	—	—	—	—	—	—	Teradata
TRIM_ARRAY	SQL-2023	—	—	—	—	—	—	—
TRUE	SQL-2023	—	Mimer	MySQL	—	PostgreSQL	—	Teradata
TRUNCATE	SQL-2023	DB2	—	—	—	—	SQL Server	—
TRY_CONVERT	—	—	—	—	—	—	SQL Server	—
TSEQUAL	—	—	—	—	—	—	SQL Server	—
TYPE	—	DB2	—	—	—	—	—	Teradata
UC	—	—	—	—	—	—	—	Teradata
UESCAPE	SQL-2023	—	—	—	—	—	—	—
UID	—	—	—	—	Oracle	—	—	—
UNDEFINED	—	—	—	—	—	—	—	Teradata
UNDER	—	—	—	—	—	—	—	Teradata
UNDO	—	DB2	—	MySQL	—	—	—	Teradata
UNION	SQL-2023	DB2	Mimer	MySQL	Oracle	PostgreSQL	SQL Server	Teradata
UNIQUE	SQL-2023	DB2	Mimer	MySQL	Oracle	PostgreSQL	SQL Server	Teradata
UNKNOWN	SQL-2023	—	Mimer	—	—	—	—	Teradata
UNLOCK	—	—	—	MySQL	—	—	—	—
UNNEST	SQL-2023	—	—	—	—	—	—	Teradata
UNPIVOT	—	—	—	—	—	—	SQL Server	—
UNSIGNED	—	—	—	MySQL	—	—	—	—
UNTIL	SQL/PSM-2016	DB2	Mimer	—	—	—	—	Teradata
UPD	—	—	—	—	—	—	—	Teradata
UPDATE	SQL-2023	DB2	Mimer	MySQL	Oracle	—	SQL Server	Teradata
UPDATETEXT	—	—	—	—	—	—	SQL Server	—
UPPER	SQL-2023	—	—	—	—	—	—	Teradata
UPPERCASE	—	—	—	—	—	—	—	Teradata
USAGE	—	—	—	MySQL	—	—	—	Teradata
USE	—	—	—	MySQL	—	—	SQL Server	—
USER	SQL-2023	DB2	Mimer	—	Oracle	PostgreSQL	SQL Server	Teradata
USING	SQL-2023	DB2	Mimer	MySQL	—	PostgreSQL	—	Teradata
UTC_DATE	—	—	—	MySQL	—	—	—	—
UTC_TIME	—	—	—	MySQL	—	—	—	—
UTC_TIMESTAMP	—	—	—	MySQL	—	—	—	—
VALIDATE	—	—	—	—	Oracle	—	—	—
VALIDPROC	—	DB2	—	—	—	—	—	—
VALUE	SQL-2023	DB2	Mimer	—	—	—	—	Teradata
VALUES	SQL-2023	DB2	Mimer	MySQL	Oracle	PostgreSQL	SQL Server	Teradata
VALUE_OF	SQL-2023	—	—	—	—	—	—	—
VARBINARY	SQL-2023	—	—	MySQL	—	—	—	—
VARBYTE	—	—	—	—	—	—	—	Teradata
VARCHAR	SQL-2023	—	—	MySQL	Oracle	—	—	Teradata
VARCHAR2	—	—	—	—	Oracle	—	—	—
VARCHARACTER	—	—	—	MySQL	—	—	—	—
VARGRAPHIC	—	—	—	—	—	—	—	Teradata
VARIABLE	—	DB2	—	—	—	—	—	Teradata
VARIADIC	—	—	—	—	—	PostgreSQL	—	—
VARIANT	—	DB2	—	—	—	—	—	—
VARYING	SQL-2023	—	Mimer	MySQL	—	—	SQL Server	Teradata
VAR_POP	SQL-2023	—	—	—	—	—	—	Teradata
VAR_SAMP	SQL-2023	—	—	—	—	—	—	Teradata
VCAT	—	DB2	—	—	—	—	—	—
VERBOSE	—	—	—	—	—	PostgreSQL	—	—
VERSIONING	SQL-2023	DB2	—	—	—	—	—	—
VIEW	—	DB2	—	—	Oracle	PostgreSQL	SQL server	Teradata
VIRTUAL	—	—	—	MySQL	—	—	—	—
VOLATILE	—	DB2	—	—	—	—	—	Teradata
VOLUMES	—	DB2	—	—	—	—	—	—
WAIT	—	—	—	—	—	—	—	Teradata
WAITFOR	—	—	—	—	—	—	SQL Server	—
WHEN	SQL-2023	DB2	Mimer	MySQL	—	PostgreSQL	SQL Server	Teradata
WHENEVER	SQL-2023	DB2	—	—	Oracle	—	—	Teradata
WHERE	SQL-2023	DB2	Mimer	MySQL	Oracle	PostgreSQL	SQL Server	Teradata
WHILE	SQL/PSM-2016	DB2	Mimer	MySQL	—	—	SQL Server	Teradata
WIDTH_BUCKET	SQL-2023	—	—	—	—	—	—	Teradata
WINDOW	SQL-2023	—	—	MySQL	—	PostgreSQL	—	—
WITH	SQL-2023	DB2	Mimer	MySQL	Oracle	PostgreSQL	SQL Server	Teradata
WITHIN	SQL-2023	—	—	—	—	—	—	—
WITHIN_GROUP	—	—	—	—	—	—	SQL Server	—
WITHOUT	SQL-2023	—	Mimer	—	—	—	—	Teradata
WLM	—	DB2	—	—	—	—	—	—
WORK	—	—	—	—	—	—	—	Teradata
WRITE	—	—	—	MySQL	—	—	—	Teradata
WRITETEXT	—	—	—	—	—	—	SQL Server	—
XMLCAST	—	DB2	—	—	—	—	—	—
XMLEXISTS	—	DB2	—	—	—	—	—	—
XMLNAMESPACES	—	DB2	—	—	—	—	—	—
XOR	—	—	—	MySQL	—	—	—	—
YEAR	SQL-2023	DB2	Mimer	—	—	—	—	Teradata
YEARS	—	DB2	—	—	—	—	—	—
YEAR_MONTH	—	—	—	MySQL	—	—	—	—
ZEROFILL	—	—	—	MySQL	—	—	—	—
ZEROIFNULL	—	—	—	—	—	—	—	Teradata
ZONE	—	DB2	—	—	—	—	—	Teradata

A dash (—) means that the keyword is not reserved.

== See also ==
- SQL
- SQL syntax
- List of relational database management systems
