= SQL/XML =

Database specification

SQL/XML or XML-Related Specifications is part 14 of the Structured Query Language (SQL) specification. In addition to the traditional predefined SQL data types like NUMERIC, CHAR, TIMESTAMP, ... it introduces the predefined data type XML together with constructors, several routines, functions, and XML-to-SQL data type mappings to support manipulation and storage of XML in a SQL database.

- SQL:2003-14 defines the basic datatype, mappings, predicates and functions.
- SQL:2006-14, SQL:2008-14 and SQL:2011-14 expands the older versions and approaches to XQuery.

== Specification ==
The specification defines the data type XML, functions for working with XML, including element construction, mapping data from relational tables, combining XML fragments, and embedding XQuery expressions in SQL statements. Functions which can be embedded include XMLQUERY (which extracts XML or values from an XML field) and XMLEXISTS (which predicates whether an XQuery expression is matched).

Further information and examples of the SQL/XML functions are provided in the external links below.

== Standard compliance ==
The result of Wagner's objective evaluation of the SQL/XML:2006 standard compliance of Oracle 11g Release 1, MS SQL Server 2008 and MySQL 5.1.30 is shown in the following table, to which the data for PostgreSQL 9.1, and IBM DB2 has been added:

	Oracle 11g Release 1	IBM DB2 9.7	MS SQL Server 2008	MySQL 5.1.30	PostgreSQL 9.1
Datatype XML	Partial (Oracle entitles the data type 'XMLType' instead of 'XML')	High	High	No	Partial
SQL/XML predicates	High	High	Partial	No	Partial
SQL/XML functions	High	High	Partial	Low	High
XQuery augmentation	Yes	Yes	Yes	No	No

== Examples ==
The sample SQLXML query below has SQLXML type as output(tested on DB2 9.7 and Oracle 11g):

SELECT XMLELEMENT(NAMEs "PhoneBook", -- root element name
                  XMLAGG(           -- aggregation over the rows
                  XMLELEMENT(NAME "Contact",
                  XMLATTRIBUTES(cust.FIRST_NAME AS "Name",
                                cust.TEL)
                              )
                        )
                  )
FROM TMP.CUSTOMER AS cust;

And the output:

<PhoneBook>
    <Contact Name="Daniel" TEL="788255855"/>
    <Contact Name="Martin" TEL="889665447"/>
    <Contact Name="Eva"    TEL="111222333"/>
    <Contact Name="Alena"  TEL="444555666"/>
    <Contact Name="Oliver" TEL="777888999"/>
    <Contact Name="George" TEL="444882446"/>
    <Contact Name="Jamie"  TEL="123456789"/>
</PhoneBook>

Samples are taken from javalobby article.
