= SQL:2003 =

2003 edition of the SQL standard

SQL:2003 is the fifth revision of the SQL database query language. The standard consists of 9 parts which are described in detail in SQL. It was updated by SQL:2006.

== New features ==
The SQL:2003 standard makes minor modifications to all parts of SQL:1999 (also known as SQL3), and officially introduces a few new features such as:

- XML-related features (SQL/XML)
- Window functions
- the sequence generator, which allows standardized sequences
- two new column types: auto-generated values and identity-columns
- the new MERGE statement
- extensions to the CREATE TABLE statement, to allow "CREATE TABLE AS" and "CREATE TABLE LIKE"
- removal of the poorly implemented "BIT" and "BIT VARYING" data types
- OLAP capabilities (initially added in SQL:1999) were extended with a window function.

For details see.

== Documentation availability ==
The SQL standard is not freely available but may be purchased from ISO or ANSI. A late draft is available as a zip archive from Whitemarsh Information Systems Corporation. The zip archive contains a number of PDF files that define the parts of the SQL:2003 specification.
