= SQL:2023 =

2023 edition of the SQL standard

SQL:2023 or ISO/IEC 9075:2023 (under the general title "Information technology – Database languages – SQL") is the ninth edition of the ISO (1987) and ANSI (1986) standard for the SQL database query language. It was formally adopted in June 2023.

== New features ==
SQL:2023 includes new and updated features. The changes can be grouped into three main areas:

- Property graph queries, a graph query language built on top of SQL
  - The new part 16, “Property Graph Queries (SQL/PGQ)”, has been added to the SQL standard.
- New features related to JSON
  - JSON data type (T801)
  - Enhanced JSON data type (T802)
  - String-based JSON (T803)
  - Hex integer literals in SQL/JSON path language (T840)
  - SQL/JSON simplified accessor (T860–T864)
  - SQL/JSON item methods (T865–T878)
  - JSON comparison (T879–T882)
- Various smaller changes to the existing SQL language (all optional features):
  - UNIQUE null treatment (F292)
  - ORDER BY in grouped table (F868)
  - GREATEST and LEAST (T054)
  - String padding functions (T055)
  - Multi-character TRIM function (T056)
  - Optional string types maximum length (T081)
  - Enhanced cycle mark values (T133)
  - ANY_VALUE (T626)
  - Underscores in numeric literals (T662)

=== Property Graph Queries (SQL/PGQ) ===
SQL/PGQ reduces the difference in functionality between relational DBMSs and native graph DBMSs. Basically, this new feature makes it easier to query data in tables as if it were in a graph database, providing a possibly more intuitive alternative to writing complex join queries.

In comparison, the GQL standard for graph DBMSs adds graph updates, querying multiple graphs, and queries that return a graph result rather than a binding table.

== See also ==
- SQL/PGQ Property Graph Query
- SQL:2023 reserved words
