= SQL:2008 =

2008 edition of the SQL standard

SQL:2008 is the sixth revision of the ISO and ANSI standard for the SQL database query language. It was formally adopted in July 2008. The standard consists of 9 parts which are described in detail in SQL. The next iteration is SQL:2011

== New features ==
Additions to the Foundation include

- enhanced MERGE and DIAGNOSTIC statements,
- the TRUNCATE TABLE statement,
- comma-separated WHEN clauses in a CASE expression,
- INSTEAD OF database triggers,
- partitioned JOIN tables,
- support for various XQuery regular expression/pattern-matching features, and
- enhancements to derived column names.

== Documentation ==
The SQL standards documentation is not freely available but may be purchased from the ISO as ISO/IEC 9075(1-4,9-11,13,14):2008.

== Claims of conformance ==
The minimum level of conformance to SQL:2008 that a product can claim is called "Core SQL:2008" and is limited to definitions specified in two parts of the standard: the Foundation and the Information and Definition Schemas.
