= List of SQL software and tools =

SQL software and development tools

This is a list of software and programming tools for the SQL language, including RDBMSs, database clients, IDEs, Database administration tools, migration tools, and related projects.

== Relational database management systems (RDBMSs) ==
- 4th Dimension
- Access Database Engine
- Actian Zen
- Adabas D
- Altibase
- Amazon Aurora
- Apache Derby
- Apache Ignite
- ClickHouse
- Clustrix
- CockroachDB
- CUBRID
- DataEase
- Dataphor
- dBase
- DuckDB
- Empress Embedded Database
- EnterpriseDB
- eXtremeDB
- Exasol
- Extensible Storage Engine
- FileMaker Pro
- Firebird
- FrontBase
- Greenplum
- H2
- Helix
- HSQLDB
- IBM Db2
- Informix
- Ingres
- InterBase
- InterSystems Caché
- InterSystems IRIS
- Linter SQL RDBMS
- MariaDB
- MaxDB
- Microsoft Azure SQL Database
- Microsoft SQL Server
- Microsoft SQL Server Express
- Mimer SQL
- MonetDB
- mSQL
- MySQL
- Netezza
- NexusDB
- NonStop SQL
- NuoDB
- OpenLink Virtuoso
- Oracle database
- Oracle Rdb
- Panorama
- Paradox
- Percona Server for MySQL
- Percona XtraDB
- Polyhedra
- PostgreSQL
- Postgres Plus Advanced Server
- R:Base
- SAP HANA
- SAP Adaptive Server Enterprise
- SAP IQ
- SingleStore
- Snowflake Cloud Data Warehouse
- solidDB
- SQL Anywhere
- SQLBase
- SQLite
- SQream DB
- SAP Advantage Database Server
- Teradata
- TiDB
- TimesTen
- Trafodion
- Transbase
- Unisys OS 2200 databases
- UniData
- UniVerse
- Vectorwise
- VoltDB
- YugabyteDB

== Database clients and management tools ==
- Adminer
- Apache OpenOffice Base
- DbVisualizer
- DBeaver
- DatabaseSpy
- Database Workbench
- dbForge
- HeidiSQL
- LibreOffice Base
- Microsoft Access
- Microsoft SQL Server Management Studio
- MySQL Workbench
- Navicat
- Oracle Enterprise Manager
- pgAdmin
- phpLiteAdmin
- PhpSQLiteAdmin
- phpMyAdmin
- SQL Database Studio
- sqsh
- Toad Data Modeler
- TOra

== Database migration and version control ==
- Flyway — database migration tool
- Liquibase — database schema change management

== Data modeling tools ==
- ER/Studio — data modeling and architecture tool from IDERA
- erwin Data Modeler — data modeling software
- PowerDesigner – data modeling and data Warehouse

== SQL IDEs and development tools ==
- Application Development System Online (ADSO) — 4GL and development environment for IDMS databases
- DataGrip — SQL IDE by JetBrains
- DbForge Studio – query building, data editing, debugging, and database management tools.
- Oracle SQL Developer — IDE for Oracle Database
- PL/SQL Developer – Oracle database environment that focuses on the development of PL/SQL stored-program units
- SQLyog
- SQuirreL SQL Client
- Toad — IDE and management tool for various RDBMSs
- SynapseDBA - SQL/NoSQL Database IDE via ODBC

== Database drivers and ORMs ==
- JDBC — Java database connectivity
- ODBC — Open Database Connectivity
- SQLAlchemy — Python SQL toolkit and ORM
- Hibernate — Java ORM framework
- Doctrine — PHP ORM framework
- Entity Framework — .NET ORM framework
- ActiveRecord — Ruby ORM framework

== Data analysis and business intelligence ==
- DuckDB — in-process SQL OLAP database for analytics
- Metabase — open-source business intelligence tool
- Tableau — data visualization and analysis
- Power BI — Microsoft business intelligence platform
- Apache Superset — modern data exploration and visualization platform
- Redash — open-source query and visualization platform
- Vertica — columnar SQL database optimized for data warehousing and large-scale analytics

== Testing and performance tools ==
- AI SQL Tuner Studio — SQL Server performance tuning tool; analyzes workloads, provides optimization recommendations
- HammerDB — load testing and benchmarking tool for databases
- pgbench — PostgreSQL benchmarking tool

== Backup, replication, and high availability ==
- pgBackRest — open-source PostgreSQL backup and restore tool
- Oracle Data Guard — high availability and disaster recovery
- SymmetricDS — database replication and synchronization

== See also ==
- DB-Engine Ranking list
- DataFlex — programming language and development environment for business applications with support for SQL databases
- Microsoft Visual FoxPro — programming language and database system with SQL-like query support
- List of data science software
- List of NoSQL software and tools
- List of R software and tools
- NoSQL
- NewSQL
