= Comparison of database administration tools =

The following tables compare general and technical information for a number of available database administration tools. Please see individual product articles for further information. This article is neither all-inclusive nor necessarily up to date.

Systems listed on a light purple background are no longer in active development.

== General ==
Product	Creator	Latest stable release date	Latest stable release version	License	Runs on Windows	Runs on macOS	Runs on Linux	Oracle	MySQL	PostgreSQL	MS SQL Server	ODBC	JDBC	SQLite	Other	Programming language
SQL Commander	Elphsoft Ltd.	2026-07-03	3.0.0.20	Proprietary	Yes	Yes	Yes	Yes	Yes	Yes	Yes	Yes		Yes	MongoDB, IBM DB2, IBM Informix, MariaDB, InterBase, Firebird, MariaDB, SAP Advantage Database, SAP SQL Anywhere, MS Access, Teradata, DBF, Excel	Delphi
SQLPro Studio	Hankinsoft Development, Inc.	2026-03-01	2025.1	Proprietary	Yes	Yes	No	Yes	Yes	Yes	Yes	No	No	Yes	MariaDB, Amazon Redshift	Swift Objective-C
DatabaseSpy	Altova	2025-10-21[±]	2026	Proprietary	Yes	No	No	Yes	Yes	Yes	Yes	Yes	Yes		IBM Db2, Sybase, MS Access	C++
Database Workbench	Upscene Productions	2026-03-19	6.10.4	Proprietary	Yes	needs Wine	needs Wine	Yes	Yes	Yes	Yes	Yes		Yes	InterBase, Firebird, NexusDB, MariaDB	Delphi
DataGrip	JetBrains	2026-02-05	2025.3.5	Proprietary	Yes	Yes	Yes	Yes	Yes	Yes	Yes	No	Yes	Yes	Sybase, IBM Db2, H2, Hypersonic SQL, Amazon Redshift, Apache Derby, Redis, MongoDB, Snowflake, Exasol, BigQuery, Cassandra, ClickHouse, CockroachDB, Couchbase	Java
DBeaver	Serge Rider	2026-11-15	26.2.5	Apache License	Yes	Yes	Yes	Yes	Yes	Yes	Yes	Yes	Yes	Yes	EXASOL, IBM Db2, Apache Derby, Firebird, Mimer SQL, all with JDBC driver	Java
DbVisualizer	DbVis Software	2026-03-06	26.1	Proprietary	Yes	Yes	Yes	Yes	Yes	Yes	Yes	No	Yes	Yes	MongoDB, Redis, Snowflake, Elasticsearch, IBM Db2, SQLite, Microsoft Access, Databricks, Apache Cassandra, MariaDB, DynamoDB, Azure SQL Database, Google BigQuery, Apache Hive, Teradata, Apache Solr, SAP ASE, ClickHouse, Amazon Redshift, Presto, H2, DuckDB, Trino, SingleStore, all with JDBC driver	Java
DBEdit	Jef Van Den Ouweland	2012-05-10	2.4.6	GPL	Yes	Yes	Yes	Yes	Yes	Yes	Yes	No	Yes	Yes	IBM Db2, HSQLDB, Apache Derby, H2	Java
dbForge Edge	Devart	2025-04-18	5.1	Proprietary	Yes	needs CrossOver	needs Wine or CrossOver	Yes	Yes	Yes	Yes	Yes (Note: Only for Data Import/Export features.)	No	No	MariaDB, Galera Cluster, Percona, HeatWave MySQL, Google Cloud, Oracle Cloud, Amazon RDS, Amazon Aurora, Amazon Redshift, Alibaba Cloud, SQL Azure, Tencent Cloud, Heroku, Aiven Cloud, SkySQL, DigitalOcean Managed Database, Kamatera Performance Cloud	.NET
HeidiSQL	Ansgar Becker	2026-10-25[±]	12.22	GPL	Yes	Yes	Yes		Yes	Yes	Yes			Yes		Delphi
Microsoft SQL Server Management Studio	Microsoft	2026-03-18	22.4.1	Proprietary	Yes	No	No				Yes				including SSAS management, and MDX, DMX, XMLA languages	.NET
MySQL Workbench	Oracle Corporation	2026-04-02[±]	8.0.47	Community Ed: GPL Standard Ed: Commercial Proprietary	Yes	Yes	Yes		Yes							C++, C#, Objective-C, Python
Navicat	PremiumSoft CyberTech Ltd.	2025-07-21	17.3	Proprietary	Yes	Yes	Yes	Yes	Yes	Yes	Yes	Yes		Yes		Delphi Objective-C
Navicat Data Modeler	PremiumSoft CyberTech Ltd.	2024-05-13	4	Proprietary	Yes	Yes	Yes	Yes	Yes	Yes	Yes	Yes		Yes		Delphi Objective-C
Oracle Enterprise Manager	Oracle Corp.	2025-05-21	13.5	Proprietary	Yes	No	Yes	Yes	Yes		Yes				IBM Db2, Sybase, TimesTen	Java
Oracle SQL Developer	Oracle Corp.	2024-12-16	24.3.1.347.1826	Proprietary	Yes	Yes	Yes	Yes	Yes	No	Yes	Yes	Yes		Microsoft Access, Sybase, IBM Db2, Teradata	Java
pgAdmin	pgAdmin Development Team	2026-11-04; 13 days ago	9.19	PostgreSQL License	Yes	Yes	Yes			Yes						C++
phpLiteAdmin	Dane Iracleous, Christopher Kramer, others	2019-09-05	1.9.8.2	GPL	Yes	Yes	Yes	No	No	No	No	No	No	Yes		PHP
phpMyAdmin	phpMyAdmin Development Team	2025-10-08; 13 months ago[±]	5.2.3	GPL	Yes	Yes	Yes		Yes						Drizzle, MariaDB	php
PopSQL	PopSQL, Inc. (TigerData)	Web-based, rolling releases	—N/a	Proprietary	Yes (Note: Runs in a web browser; desktop app also available.)	Yes	Yes	No	Yes	Yes	Yes	No	No	No	Amazon Redshift, Snowflake, BigQuery, ClickHouse, Amazon Athena, Azure Synapse, Presto, Trino	TypeScript
SaturnSQL	Panda Capital Oy Ab	Web-based, rolling releases	—N/a	Proprietary	Yes	Yes	Yes	Yes	Yes	Yes	Yes	No	No	No	MariaDB, Amazon Redshift, ClickHouse, BigQuery, Amazon DynamoDB	TypeScript
SQL Database Studio	Jan Prochazka	2017-05-10	3.6.2	Proprietary	Yes	No	No	No	No	No	Yes					.NET, WPF, C#
SQLyog	Webyog Softworks Pvt. Ltd.	2025-09-26[±]	13.3.1	GPLv2	Yes	needs Wine	needs Wine		Yes							C++
SQuirreL SQL	Colin Bell, Gerd Wagner, Rob Manning, others	2026-03-26 [±]	5.1.0	GPLv2 & LGPLv2	Yes	Yes	Yes	Yes	Yes	Yes	Yes	Yes	Yes	Yes	Access, Axion Java RDBMS, Apache Derby, Daffodil DB, FileMaker (JDBC), Fujitsu Siemens SESAM/SQL, Firebird, FrontBase, HSQLDB, Hypersonic SQL, H2 (DBMS), IBM Db2, Informix, Ingres, OpenIngres, InstantDB, InterBase, Mckoi SQL Database, Mimer SQL, Netezza, Pointbase, SAPDB, Sybase, Sunopsis XML Driver, Teradata Warehouse, ThinkSQL RDBMS, Vertica Analytic Database.	Java
Toad	Quest Software	Various	Various	Proprietary	Yes	No	No	Yes	Yes		Yes	Yes			IBM Db2, Sybase	Delphi, C#.NET
Toad Data Modeler	Quest Software	2025-03-05	8.0	Proprietary	Yes	No	No	Yes	Yes	Yes	Yes				IBM Db2, MS Access, Sybase	Delphi
TOra	Community	2017-07-04	3.2	GPL	Yes	Yes	Yes	Yes	Yes	Yes					Teradata	C++–Qt
TablePlus	TablePlus Inc.	2026-08-26	26.9.8	Proprietary	Yes	Yes	Yes	Yes	Yes	Yes	Yes	No	No	Yes	MariaDB, Amazon Redshift, CockroachDB, Redis, Cassandra	
Product	Creator	Latest stable release date	Latest stable release version	License	Runs on Windows	Runs on macOS	Runs on Linux	Oracle	MySQL	PostgreSQL	MS SQL Server	ODBC	JDBC	SQLite	Other	Programming language

== Features ==
Legend

- User Interface:
  - Browser based – executes on a computer server and is accessed via a network using a web browser
  - desktop – executes on a personal computer
- Create/alter table:
  - Yes – can create table, alter its definition and data, and add new rows
  - Some – can only create/alter table definition, not data
- Browse table:
  - Yes – can browse table definition and data
  - Some – can only browse table definition
- Multi-server support:
  - Yes – can manage from the same window/session multiple servers
  - Some – can manage from a different window/session multiple servers
- Monitoring server:
  - Yes – includes a headless server, that runs checks and reports failures

Tools	User Interface	Create & Alter wizard				Browse				Auto Completion	Syntax colored	Multi server support	Monitoring server
Tools	User Interface	Database	Table	Procedure	Trigger	Database	Table	Procedure	Trigger	Auto Completion	Syntax colored	Multi server support	Monitoring server
Adminer	Browser-based	Yes	Yes	Yes	Yes	Yes	Yes	Yes	Yes	No	Yes	?	?
Altova DatabaseSpy	desktop	Yes	Yes	Yes	Yes	Yes	Yes	Yes	Yes	Yes	Yes	Yes	?
Database Workbench	desktop	Yes	Yes	Yes	Yes	Yes	Yes	Yes	Yes	Yes	Yes	Yes	?
DataGrip	desktop	Yes	Yes	Yes	Yes	Yes	Yes	Yes	Yes	Yes	Yes	Yes	No
DBeaver	desktop	Yes	Yes	Yes	Yes	Yes	Yes	Yes	Yes	Yes	Yes	Yes	Yes
DbVisualizer	desktop	Yes	Yes	Yes	Yes	Yes	Yes	Yes	Yes	Yes	Yes	Yes	Yes
DBEdit	desktop	No	No	No	No	Yes	Yes	Yes	No	No	Yes	No	?
dbForge	desktop	Yes	Yes	Yes	Yes	Yes	Yes	Yes	Yes	Yes	Yes	Yes	Some
Microsoft SQL Server Management Studio	desktop	Yes	Yes	Yes	Yes	Yes	Yes	Yes	Yes	Yes	Yes	Yes	No
MySQL Workbench	desktop	Yes	Yes	Yes	Yes	Yes	Yes	Yes	Yes	Yes	Yes	Yes	Some
Navicat	desktop	Yes	Yes	Yes	Yes	Yes	Yes	Yes	Yes	Yes	Yes	Yes	?
Navicat Data Modeler	desktop	No	Yes	No	Yes	No	No	No	No	Yes	Yes	Yes	?
Oracle Enterprise Manager	Browser-based	Yes	Yes	Yes	Yes	Yes	Yes	Yes	Yes	Yes	Yes	?	Yes
Oracle SQL Developer	desktop	Yes	Yes	Yes	Yes	Yes	Yes	Yes	Yes	Yes	Yes	Yes	No
pgAdmin	Browser-based, desktop (TDI)	Yes	Yes	Yes	Yes	Yes	Yes	Yes	Yes	Yes	Yes	Yes	Some
phpLiteAdmin	Browser-based	Yes	Yes	No	Yes	Yes	Yes	No	Yes	Yes	Yes	?	?
phpMyAdmin	Browser-based	Yes	Yes	Yes	Yes	Yes	Yes	Yes	Yes	Yes	Yes	Yes	Yes
SaturnSQL	Browser-based	No	No	No	No	Yes	Yes	Yes	Yes	Yes	Yes	Yes	No
SQL Database Studio	desktop	Yes	Yes	Yes	Yes	Yes	Yes	Yes	Yes	Yes	Yes	Yes	No
SQLyog	desktop	Yes	Yes	Yes	Yes	Yes	Yes	Yes	Yes	Yes	Yes	?	?
SQuirreL SQL	desktop	?	?	?	?	Yes	Yes	?	?	Yes	Yes	Some	?
Toad	desktop	Yes	Yes	Yes	Yes	Yes	Yes	Yes	Yes	Yes	Yes	Yes	Yes
Toad Data Modeler	desktop	Yes	Yes	Yes	Yes	Some	Some	Some	Some	No	Yes	?	?
TOra	desktop	No	Yes	Yes	No	Yes	Yes	Yes	Yes	Yes	Yes	Yes	?

== Features (continued) ==
Legend:

- User manager:
  - Yes – user manager with support for database and schema permissions as well as for individual object (table, view, functions) permissions
  - Some – simple user manager with support for database and schema permissions
  - No – no user manager, or read-only user manager

	user manager	Plugin	Compare	Import	Export	Debugger	Source control	Spatial Visualization
Adminer	Yes	Yes	Yes	SQL script, CSV, TSV or the above in zip (as a plugin); imports of server-site file in SQL or SQL in zip, gzip or bzip2	SQL script, CSV, TSV or the above in zip, gzip, bzip2; XML (as a plugin)	No	Git	
Altova DatabaseSpy	No	No	Yes	CSV, XML	XML, XML Structure, CSV, HTML, MS Excel	No	?	
Database Workbench	Yes	No	Yes	Yes	Yes	Yes	Yes	
DataGrip	No	Yes	Yes	Yes	TXT, CSV, HTML, XML, DBF, SQL script, RTF, MS Word, MS Excel, MS Access, MS Windows Clipboard, Paradox file, WK1, WQ1, SLK, DIF, LDIF	No	Yes	
DBeaver	Yes	Yes	Yes	Yes	Yes	No	With Eclipse plugins	
DbVisualizer	No	No	Yes	Yes	Yes	No	Git	
DBEdit	No	No	No	No	MS Excel, PDF, Text, SQL script	No	?	
dbForge	Yes	No	Yes	Yes – TXT, CSV, XML, XLS, XLSX, DBF, JSON, Google Sheets, MS Access, or from any ODBC source	Yes – TXT, CSV, XML, XLS, XLSX, DBF, JSON, Google Sheets, MS Access, PDF, HTML, RTF, SQL script, or from any ODBC source	Yes	Yes (Note: Only for SQL Server and MySQL/MariaDB.)	No
Navicat	Yes	No	Yes	Yes – TXT, CSV, DBF, HTML, MS Excel, MS Access, Paradox file, WK1, WQ1, XML, or from any ODBC source (See link for limitations)	Yes – TXT, CSV, HTML, XML, DBF, SQL script, RTF, MS Word, MS Excel, MS Access, MS Windows Clipboard, Paradox file, WK1, WQ1, SLK, DIF, LDIF (See link for limitations)	Yes	No	
Navicat Data Modeler	No	No	Yes	Yes – Import Database from server/ODBC	Yes – Export SQL	No	No	
MySQL Workbench	Yes	Yes	Yes	Yes – CSV, HTML, JSON, MS Excel, SQL INSERTS, Tab-separated, XML	Yes – CSV, HTML, JSON, MS Excel, SQL INSERTS, Tab-separated, XML	Yes	No	
Oracle SQL Developer	Yes	Yes	Yes	Yes	Yes	Yes	Yes	Yes
pgAdmin	Yes	Yes	No	CSV, Text, or binary	CSV, text, HTML, XML	Yes	No	
phpMyAdmin	Yes	Some	Yes	Yes – CSV, SQL, XML, Excel, ODS	Yes – CSV, LaTeX, Excel, Word, ODS, ODT, XML, SQL, YAML, Texy!, JSON, NHibernate, PHP, PDF, MediaWiki	Yes	Git	
SQL Database Studio	Yes	Yes	No	CSV, XML, MS Excel	CSV, HTML, MS Excel, SQL INSERTS, Tab-separated, XML	No	No	
SQLyog	Yes	?	Yes	Yes	Yes	?	?	
SQL Server Management Studio	Yes	Yes	?	Yes	Yes	Yes	Yes	Yes
SQuirreL SQL	?	Yes	Yes	Yes	?	No	?	
Toad	Some	No	Yes	Yes	Yes	Yes	SVN, CVS, TFS, VSS	
Toad Data Modeler	No	?	Yes	Toad for Oracle ERD, ERWin 7.1(XML) via plugin	SQL; meta data in XML; report in HTML/RTF/CSV; diagram as BMP, JPEG, PNG	No	?	
TOra	Some	No	Yes	Yes	Yes	Yes	No	

== Features – visual design and reverse engineering ==
Legend:

- Visual schema/E-R design: the ability to draw entity–relationship diagrams for the database. If missing, the following two features will also be missing
- Reverse engineering – the ability to produce an ER diagram from a database, complete with foreign key relationships
  - Yes – supports incremental reverse engineering, preserving user modifications to the diagram and importing only changes from the database
  - Some – can only reverse engineer the entire database at once and drops any user modifications to the diagram (can't "refresh" the diagram to match the database)
- Forward engineering – the ability to update the database schema with changes made to its entities and relationships via the ER diagram visual designer
  - Yes – can update user-selected entities
  - Some – can only update the entire database at once

	Visual query builder	Visual schema/model/E-R diagram design	Reverse engineering	Forward engineering	ER diagram groupboxes
Adminer	Yes	Yes	Yes	No	No
Altova DatabaseSpy	Yes	Yes	Yes	Yes	?
Database Workbench	Yes	Yes	Yes	?	Yes
DBeaver	No	Yes	Yes	No	?
DbVisualizer	Yes	Yes	?	?	?
DBEdit	No	No	No	No	No
dbForge	Yes	Yes	Yes	Yes	No
Navicat	Yes	Yes	Yes	Yes	Yes
Navicat Data Modeler	Yes	Yes	Yes	Yes	Yes
MySQL Workbench	Yes	Yes	Yes	Yes	Yes
Oracle SQL Developer	Yes	Yes	Yes	Yes	?
pgAdmin	Yes	No	No	No	No
phpMyAdmin	Yes	Yes	Yes	No	No
SQL Database Studio	Yes	Yes	Yes	Yes	No
SQL Server Management Studio	?	Yes	Yes	?	?
SQLyog	Yes	Yes	Yes	Yes	?
SQuirreL SQL	Yes	Yes	Yes (Note: Only incremental, by manually going through each table and clicking "Add to graph".)	?	No
Toad	Yes	Yes	Yes	Yes	?
Toad Data Modeler	No	Yes	Yes	Yes (Note: Generated SQL must be executed outside Toad Data Modeler.)	?

== See also ==
- Comparison of data modeling tools
- Comparison of object database management systems
- Comparison of object–relational database management systems
- Comparison of relational database management systems
- List of relational database management systems
- List of SQL software and tools
- SQL programming tool
