= DBeaver =

Multi-platform database administration software

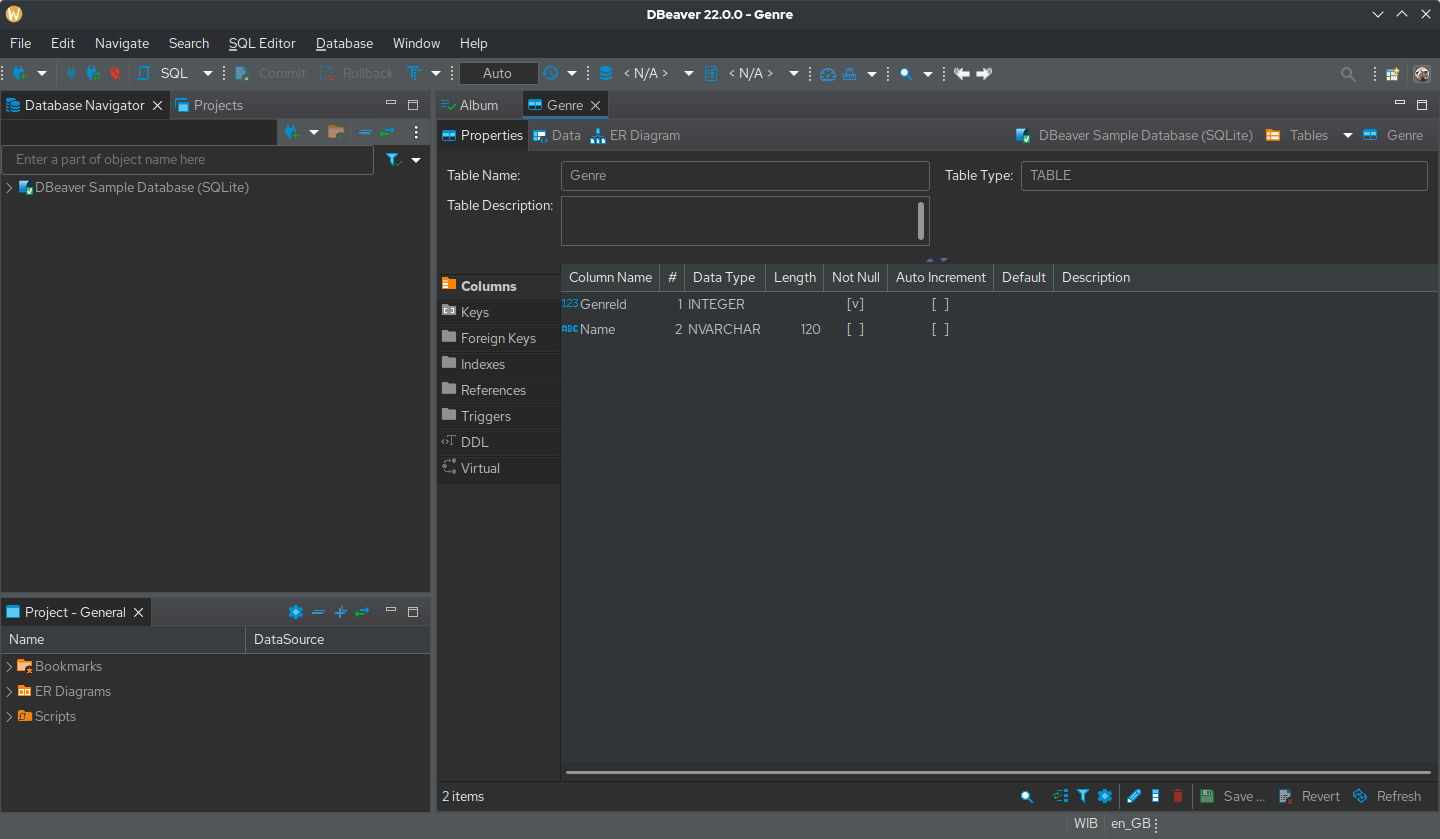
- Original author: Serge Rider
- Developers: DBeaver Corp, and community
- Release: 2011; 15 years ago
- Stable release: 26.2.3 / 18 October 2026; 10 days ago
- Written in: Java
- Operating system: Cross-platform
- Platform: Eclipse
- Available in: Multilingual
- Type: SQL database administration tool
- License: Apache license
- Website: dbeaver.io
- Repository: github.com/dbeaver/dbeaver

DBeaver is a SQL client software application and a database administration tool. For relational databases it uses the JDBC application programming interface (API) to interact with databases via a JDBC driver. For other databases (NoSQL) it uses proprietary database drivers. It provides an editor that supports code completion and syntax highlighting. It provides a plug-in architecture (based on the Eclipse plugins architecture) that allows users to modify much of the application's behavior to provide database-specific functionality or features that are database-independent. It is written in Java and based on the Eclipse platform.

The community edition (CE) of DBeaver is a free and open source software that is distributed under the Apache License. A closed-source enterprise edition of DBeaver is distributed under a commercial license.

== History ==
DBeaver was started in 2010 as a hobby project. It was supposed to be free and open-source with a good-looking and convenient UI and to include frequently used features for database developers. The first official release was in 2011 on Freecode. It quickly became a popular tool in the open-source community.

In the same year, the official web site was founded and the community support forum (now moved to GitHub) was created. In 2012 an Eclipse plugin version was released - since then DBeaver has become one of the most popular database extensions for Eclipse (top 50-60 among all Eclipse extensions).

Shortly after, various software vendors started to integrate with DBeaver (mostly as an extensions to their proprietary Eclipse RCP products: Zend Studio, NXTware, DeltaDNA, etc.).

In 2014 the Enterprise Edition (EE) version was released. The EE version is based on CE but also provides support of NoSQL/BigData databases (Cassandra, MongoDB and Redis) and includes a few additional Eclipse plugins.

In 2015 the DBeaver source code/community moved to GitHub.

In 2017 DBeaver CE was relicensed under Apache License (starting from version 4.x).

In July 2017 DBeaver EE version became commercial in order to support CE version.

== Supported platforms and languages ==
DBeaver is a cross-platform tool and works on platforms which are supported by Eclipse (Windows, Linux, macOS, Solaris), it is available in English, Chinese, Russian, Italian, and German.

== Versions ==
Full list of all released versions

=== Community Edition ===
Community Edition (CE) is the initial version of DBeaver. It was released in 2010 and became open-source (GPL) in 2011. CE version includes extended support of the following databases:

- TiDB
- MySQL and MariaDB
- PostgreSQL
- Greenplum
- Oracle
- IBM Db2
- Exasol
- SQL Server
- Mimer SQL
- Sybase
- Firebird
- Teradata
- Vertica
- SAP HANA
- Apache Phoenix
- Netezza
- Informix
- Apache Derby
- H2
- Salesforce Data Cloud
- SQLite
- SnappyData
- Snowflake
- Any other database which has JDBC or ODBC driver.

Besides relational databases, CE version supports WMI driver (Windows Management Instrumentation – works only in Windows version).

=== Eclipse Plugin Edition ===
After a year, and in response to multiple user requests an Eclipse plugin version was released on Eclipse Marketplace. This version is used by programmers who use the Eclipse IDE for software development and need a database management tool right in their IDE. The Eclipse plugin includes most features of Community Edition and is also released under GPL license.

=== Enterprise Edition ===
DBeaver 3.x announced support of NoSQL databases (Cassandra and MongoDB in the initial version). Since then DBeaver was divided on Community and Enterprise editions. Enterprise Edition has support of NoSQL databases, persistent query manager and a few other enterprise-level features. The EE version is not open-source and requires the purchase of a license (a trial license can be generated free of charge). List of additional features:

- Cassandra
- MongoDB
- Redis
- Persistent QM
- JSON documents editor (mostly for MongoDB)
- Eclipse EE features (resources management, Marketplace UI)

== Features ==
DBeaver features include:

- SQL queries execution
- Data browser/editor with a huge number of features
- Syntax highlighting and SQL auto-completion
- Database structure (metadata) browse and edit
- SQL scripts management
- DDL generation
- ERD (Entity Relationship Diagrams) rendering
- SSH tunnelling
- SSL support (MySQL and PostgreSQL)
- Data export/migration
- Import, export and backup of data (MySQL and PostgreSQL)
- Mock data generation for database testing
- Comparison of structural differences between two tables

There are differences in the features available across different databases.

== See also ==
- Comparison of database tools
- HeidiSQL
- SQuirreL SQL Client
