= SQuirreL SQL Client =

Database administration tool

- Developers: Colin Bell, Gerd Wagner, Rob Manning and others
- Stable release: 4.6.0 / 2023-06-04 [±]
- Preview release: 20231120_2225 / November 20, 2023; 2 years ago
- Repository: sourceforge.net/p/squirrel-sql/git/ci/master/tree/
- Written in: Java
- Operating system: Cross-platform
- Platform: Java
- Type: Database administration tool
- License: LGPL
- Website: www.squirrelsql.org

The SQuirreL SQL Client is a database administration tool. It uses JDBC to allow users to explore and interact with databases via a JDBC driver. It provides an editor that offers code completion and syntax highlighting for standard SQL. It also provides a plugin architecture that allows plugin writers to modify much of the application's behavior to provide database-specific functionality or features that are database-independent. As this desktop application is written entirely in Java with Swing UI components, it should run on any platform that has a JVM.

SQuirreL SQL Client is free as open source software that is distributed under the GNU Lesser General Public License.

== Feature summary ==
- Object Tree allows for browsing database objects such as catalogs, schemas, tables, triggers, views, sequences, procedures, UDTs, etc.
- The SQL Editor, based on RSyntaxTextArea by fifesoft.com, provides syntax highlighting. It can open, create, save and execute files containing SQL statements.
- SQuirreL supports simultaneous sessions with multiple databases. This allows comparing data and sharing SQL statements between databases.
- SQuirreL runs on any platform that has a JVM.
- A plugin architecture facilitates database vendor-specific extensions (information or actions not available using standard JDBC)
- Translations for the user interface exist in: (Bulgarian, Brazilian Portuguese, Chinese, Czech, French, German, Italian, Japanese, Polish, Spanish, Russian).
- Graph capabilities can generate charts showing table relationships.
- Bookmarks - user-defined code templates. SQuirreL comes with predefined example bookmarks for the most common SQL and DDL statements.

== History ==
The SQuirreL SQL project was developed by a team of Java developers around the world and led by Colin Bell. It has been hosted as a SourceForge project since 2001, and was still under active development in 2024.

== Supported databases ==
- Axion Java RDBMS.
- Apache Derby
- ClickHouse
- Fujitsu Siemens SESAM/SQL-Server with the SESAM/SQL JDBC driver
- Firebird with the JayBird JCA/JDBC Driver
- Hypersonic SQL
- H2 (DBMS)
- IBM Db2 for Linux, IBM i and Windows
- Informix
- Ingres (and OpenIngres)
- InstantDB
- InterBase
- Mckoi SQL Database
- Microsoft Access with the JDBC/ODBC bridge.
- Microsoft SQL Server
- Mimer SQL
- MonetDB
- MySQL
- Netezza
- Oracle Database 8i, 9i, 10g, 11g
- Pointbase
- PostgreSQL 7.1.3 and higher
- SAPDB
- Sybase
- Sunopsis XML Driver (JDBC Edition)
- Teradata Warehouse
- Vertica Analytic Database

== See also ==
- SQL
- Comparison of database tools
