= PhpSQLiteAdmin =

phpSQLiteAdmin is a name of two independent web applications, written in PHP, for managing SQLite databases.

phpSQLiteAdmin is a web-based client which leverages PHP scripting and the SQLite file-database system to provide a simple way for users to create databases, create tables, and query their own data using non-industry-standard SQLite syntax.

By now they seem like two abandoned projects. Currently both can be replaced by phpLiteAdmin (with support for SQLite2 and SQLite3) or PhpMinAdmin (now Adminer, which in addition to SQLite supports MySQL, MariaDB and PostgreSQL).
