= ZmEu (vulnerability scanner) =

Romanian computer vulnerability scanner

ZmEu is a computer vulnerability scanner which searches for web servers that are open to attack through the phpMyAdmin program, It also attempts to guess SSH passwords through brute-force methods, and leaves a persistent backdoor. It was developed in Romania and was especially common in 2012.

It is apparently named after Zmeu, a dragon-like being in Romanian folklore.

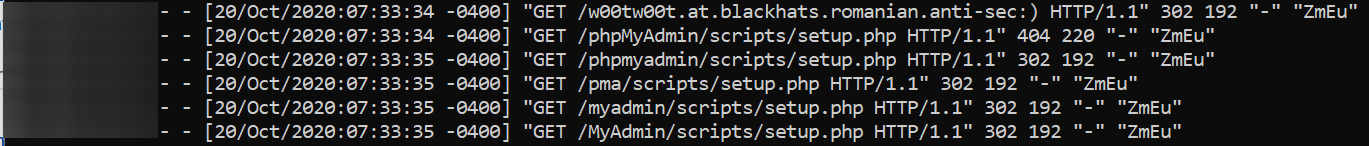
Log of a hacker running ZmEu on a webserver.
