= DbForge =

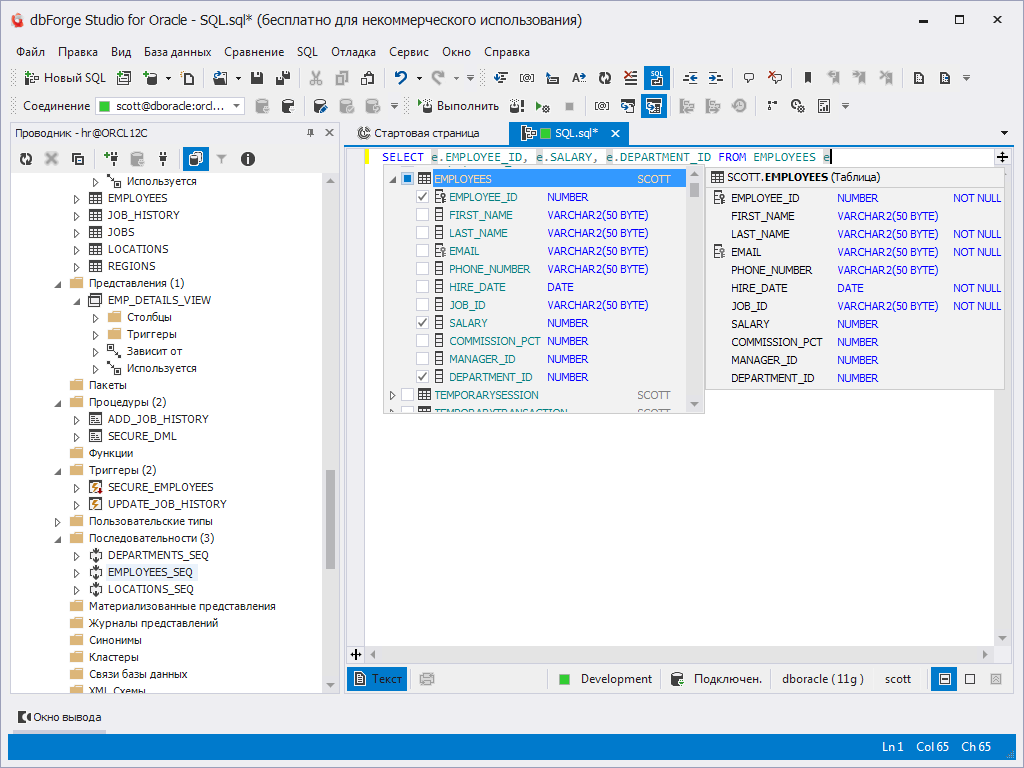
DbForge Studio for Oracle(ua)

dbForge is a database management product line started in 2005. It focuses on database development, design, management, and administration for SQL Server, MySQL, MariaDB, Oracle, PostgreSQL database management systems, and a number of cloud services, data storage platforms, and search engines. dbForge services include separate tools for code completion, database documentation, database data and schema comparison, and tool bundles for specific databases. Additionally, dbForge products provide add-ins for Microsoft SSMS and Visual Studio.

== History ==
The dbForge product line started with dbForge Studio for Oracle in May 2005. The product was previously known as OraDeveloper Studio and was rebranded to its current name in 2011. The first features of dbForge Studio for Oracle covered database export and import, a DDL generation wizard, database object search, and dynamic data viewing in Database Explorer.

dbForge Studio for MySQL was released later in 2005. Its first versions featured database user privilege management, database export and import in different formats, script generation, and dynamic data viewing in Database Explorer.

In 2010, Devart introduced dbForge Data Studio for SQL Server, which provided database development and management functionality. Later, in 2011, this service became known as dbForge Studio for SQL Server, and later that year dbForge SQL Complete was launched as an add-in for context-aware code autocompletion and debugging in SSMS and Visual Studio. In 2012, dbForge SQL Tools (ex-dbForge Developer Bundle for SQL Server), a pack of 15 products that cover different tasks related to Microsoft SQL Server and Azure SQL Database, was launched. dbForge Studio for PostgreSQL was released in March 2018. This integrated development environment (IDE) provided multiple features for PostgreSQL data reporting, data editing, data import and export, as well as for building pivot tables and master-detail relations.

In 2023, dbForge Edge was launched as a suite of four IDEs for SQL Server, MySQL/MariaDB, Oracle, and PostgreSQL database management systems, and their cloud versions. In 2023, the product line secured 62 badges for high performance and ease of implementation, five awards from SoftwareSuggest, and recognition from DBTA as the Best Database Performance Solution of 2023. By 2024, dbForge Studios had received 80 endorsements from G2 Crowd. The dbForge product line won the DBTA Best Database Development Solution 2024 nomination.

== Features ==
dbForge provides tools for SQL development, including SQL coding, debugging, visual query building, query optimization, test data generation, and version control integration. Database design is facilitated through visual object editors and database diagrams. Data is managed via import/export tools and a user-friendly data editor. dbForge products also have integrated functionality for the comparison and synchronization, backup/recovery, and migration of database schemas and data. Database administration features include the management of sessions, user roles, and permissions. Data analysis and reporting features include interactive pivot tables and customizable data reports. Recurring tasks like backups and data synchronization can be automated from the command line.

== See also ==
Comparison of database tools
