= Navicat =

SQL database management software

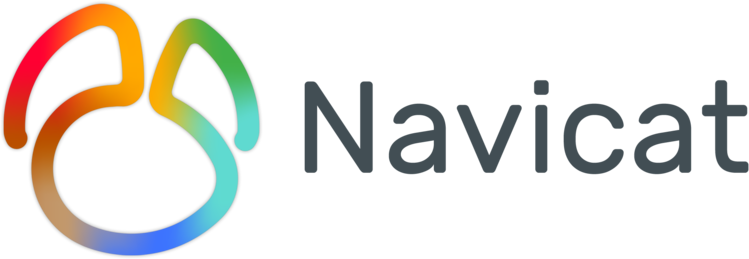
- Original author: PremiumSoft CyberTech Ltd.
- Developer: PremiumSoft CyberTech Ltd.
- Initial release: 2002
- Stable release: 17 / 2024-05-13
- Operating system: Cross-platform
- Available in: Multilingual
- Type: SQL database management and development system
- License: Proprietary / Shareware
- Website: www.navicat.com

Navicat is a series of graphical database management and development software produced by CyberTech Ltd. for MySQL, MariaDB, Redis, MongoDB, Oracle, SQLite, PostgreSQL, Microsoft SQL Server and Snowflake. It has an Explorer-like graphical user interface and supports multiple database connections for local and remote databases. Its design is made to meet the needs of a variety of audiences, from database administrators and programmers to various businesses/companies that serve clients and share information with partners.

== History ==
The main target of the initial version was to simplify the management of MySQL installations. In 2008, Navicat for MySQL was the winner of the Hong Kong ICT 2008 Award of the Year, Best Business Grand Award and Best Business (Product) Gold Award.

== Supported platforms and languages ==
Navicat is a cross-platform tool and works on Microsoft Windows, Mac OS X and Linux platforms. Upon purchase, users are able to select a language for the software from 13 available languages: English, French, German, Spanish, Japanese, Polish, Russian, Korean, Indonesian, Thai, Malay, Simplified Chinese and Traditional Chinese.

== Versions ==
=== Standalone versions ===
Officially released in March 2002, the Windows version of Navicat for MySQL became the first product offered to the public by PremiumSoft. Subsequently, the company released two additional versions of Navicat for MySQL on the Mac OS X and Linux operating system in June and October 2003 respectively. In November 2013, added the support of MariaDB. PremiumSoft continued to expand their Navicat series by releasing Navicat for PostgreSQL for Windows in October 2005 and then for Mac OS X in June 2006. The Linux version of Navicat for PostgreSQL would not be released until 3 years later in August 2009. In August 2008 Navicat decided to further continue their product line and branch out into the Oracle community, creating Navicat for Oracle for Windows and Mac. In August of the following year they followed up with a version for the Linux Platform. The Oracle version of Navicat supports most of the latest Oracle objects features including Directory, Tablespace, Synonym, Materialized View, Trigger, Sequence, and Type, etc. Navicat for SQLite was released for Windows and Mac OS X simultaneously in April 2009, and the Linux version soon followed two months later in June of the same year. In April 2010, Navicat Premium began including Navicat for SQLite starting from version 9 to expand the usability of Navicat Premium. Navicat for SQL Server was released in November 2010 for the Windows platform and Mac OS X. Also at the release, the SQL server version was included in the Premium version of Navicat. In January 2011, support for SQL Azure was added. Navicat for MariaDB was released in November 2013 for Windows, Mac OS X and Linux. Also at the release, the MariaDB version was included in both Navicat Premium and Navicat for MySQL.

In 2018, Navicat started to support NoSQL databases. MongoDB is currently the newest addition to the list of server Navicat supports. The new line of product, called Navicat for MongoDB, was released in July 2018 for Windows, Mac OS X and Linux. It provides a native environment for MongoDB management and supports the extra features like MapReduce, GridFS Buckets. Also at the release, the MongoDB version was included in Navicat Premium.

In May 2023, Navicat for Redis was released. It provides key-value data viewer, Pub/Sub feature, Command Monitor, Backup & Restore etc.

Navicat for Snowflake was officially released in March 2025. This version brings enhanced features tailored specifically for managing Snowflake databases, including advanced query building, intuitive data visualization, and seamless data migration tools.

=== Navicat Premium ===
In 2009, PremiumSoft released Navicat Premium, a series of Navicat software that combines all previous Navicat versions into a single version and can connect to different database types including MySQL, Oracle, and PostgreSQL simultaneously, allowing users to do data migration between cross databases. Navicat Premium version also supports cross-platform administration, serving Windows, Mac OS X and Linux. In April 2010, version 9 of Navicat Premium was released, which added the connectivity of SQLite database to Navicat Premium, allowing Navicat Premium to connect to MySQL, Oracle, PostgreSQL and SQLite in a single application. In November 2010, support for Microsoft SQL Server was added. In January 2011, SQL Azure was included. In November 2013, added the support of MariaDB. In July 2018, support for MongoDB was added to Navicat, enhancing its capabilities for managing NoSQL databases. In May 2023, Redis was introduced in Navicat Premium 16.2, further broadening the tool's database management options. The following year, in May 2024, version 17 was released, featuring new enhancements such as Visual Explain, Data Dictionary, and Data Profiling. In March 2025, support for Snowflake was also integrated, providing users with robust tools for managing cloud-based data solutions. Additionally, new AI features were introduced to enhance query writing, data analysis and streamline workflows.

=== Navicat Data Modeler ===
Navicat Data Modeler Windows version was officially released in March 2012. Then, Mac OS X and Linux version were released in May 2012 and June 2012. This is a standalone product for developers to create data models for MySQL, SQL Server, Oracle, PostgreSQL and SQLite databases. Navicat Data Modeler allows users to visually design database structures, perform reverse/forward engineer process, import table structures from ODBC data sources, generate SQL files and print models to files, etc. In June 2015, added the support of MariaDB databases and several features such as Model Conversion, Physical/Logical/Conceptual model types and Navicat Cloud. In May 2024, version 4 was released, and added the support of MongoDB and several features such as synchronizing database to model, comparing model workspace. In March 2025, support for Snowflake was introduced, along with new modeling methods, including Data Vault 2.0 and Dimensional modeling techniques, providing users with advanced tools for effective data structure organization and analysis.

=== Navicat iOS ===
In August 2013, PremiumSoft released a new product - Navicat iOS. It is a database administration tool developed for iOS with features included object viewer & designer, query builder & editor, Navicat Cloud, server monitor, etc. MySQL was supported in the first release. Then, Navicat for PostgreSQL iOS version was released in January 2015. In September 2017, Navicat for MariaDB iOS version was released.

=== Navicat Cloud ===
Navicat Cloud is a cloud service for users to synchronize their connection settings, queries, aggregation pipelines, snippets, model workspaces, BI workspaces and virtual group information with multiple platforms and devices. A user can share his project to others for collaborating on connection settings, queries, aggregation pipelines, snippets, model workspaces, BI workspaces and virtual group information.

=== Navicat Monitor ===
Navicat Monitor was officially released in April 2018. It is a safe, simple and agentless remote server monitoring tool and supports to monitor MySQL, MariaDB and cloud databases. Users can access Navicat Monitor from anywhere via a web browser. The main features of Navicat Monitor including real-time instance performance monitoring, alert notification, query analyzer, replications monitoring.

In June 2019, Navicat Monitor supported monitoring SQL Server instances. And PostgreSQL was added in February 2023.

=== Navicat On-Prem Server ===
Navicat On-Prem Server is a web-based, on-premise solution that provides the option to host a cloud environment for storing Navicat objects (connection settings, queries, aggregation pipelines, snippets, model workspaces, BI workspaces and virtual group information) internally at user's location. It also supports managing MySQL, MariaDB, and PostgreSQL databases.

=== Navicat BI & Viewer ===
In Nov 2021, 2 new products, Navicat Charts Creator & Navicat Charts Viewer were released. Navicat Charts Creator is a GUI tool for creating visual representations (charts & dashboards) of database data. Navicat Charts Viewer is a tool for viewing charts workspace files. In May 2024, version 2 was released and added the support of MongoDB and Snowflake. The product names were changed to Navicat BI and Navicat BI Viewer.

== Features ==
Navicat's features include:

- SSH and HTTP tunneling
- object designer
- visual query-builder
- code snippet and code completion
- visual explain
- AI assistant
- data and structure synchronization
- data transfer
- import and export data
- backup and restore data
- BI (charts & dashboard)
- data modeling
- data profiling
- data generation
- data dictionary
- task scheduling and wizards tool

There are differences in the features available across operating systems.

Navicat is also compatible with forks of MySQL such as Drizzle, OurDelta, and Percona.

Navicat supports Cloud Databases like Amazon RDS, Amazon Aurora, Amazon Redshift, SQL Azure, Oracle Cloud, Google Cloud and Alibaba Cloud.

== See also ==
- Comparison of database tools
