= DatabaseSpy =

SQL database profiling tool and GUI

Altova DatabaseSpy
- SQL editor with results view and graphical design editor in DatabaseSpy
- Developer: Altova
- Stable release: 2026 / October 21, 2025
- Operating system: Microsoft Windows
- Type: Relational database tool
- License: EULA
- Website: https://www.altova.com/databasespy

DatabaseSpy is a multi-database query, design, and database comparison tool from Altova, the creator of XMLSpy. DatabaseSpy connects to many major relational databases, facilitating SQL querying, database structure design, database content editing, and database comparison and conversion.

DatabaseSpy is a database client application for Windows that allows database administrators, database developers, and other database-oriented IT professionals to interact with multiple relational databases that may have been created by different developers.

DatabaseSpy features include a quick connection wizard for multiple relational databases, SQL editor with auto-completion, graphical database design tool, database content and schema comparison, and data import and export in multiple formats. DatabaseSpy also includes special support for XML in databases and is available in 32-bit and 64-bit versions.

== Supported databases ==
DatabaseSpy can connect to multiple databases simultaneously, including databases of different types. DatabaseSpy automatically adjusts to variations in SQL dialects and data type definitions of supported relational databases. DatabaseSpy connects to the following major database types:

- Microsoft SQL Server
- PostgreSQL
- Oracle
- MySQL
- IBM Db2
- IBM Db2 for i
- Informix
- Sybase ASE
- Microsoft Access
- MicroSoft Azure SQL
- MariaDB
- SQLite
- Firebird
- Progress OpenEdge
- Teradata
- And others

== User comments ==
From its initial release in September 2006, users have recognized the benefits of using a single tool with a consistent user interface to multiple databases to perform routine tasks such as querying or modifying tables.

The use of a common graphical interface to connect to multiple databases, possibly across different platforms, is cited as a valuable feature.

== Licensing ==
DatabaseSpy is a licensed software product that uses key protection to prevent unlicensed usage. DatabaseSpy is free to try with a no-cost 30-day trial license.

== See also ==
- Comparison of database tools
