= Adminer =

Tool for managing content in databases

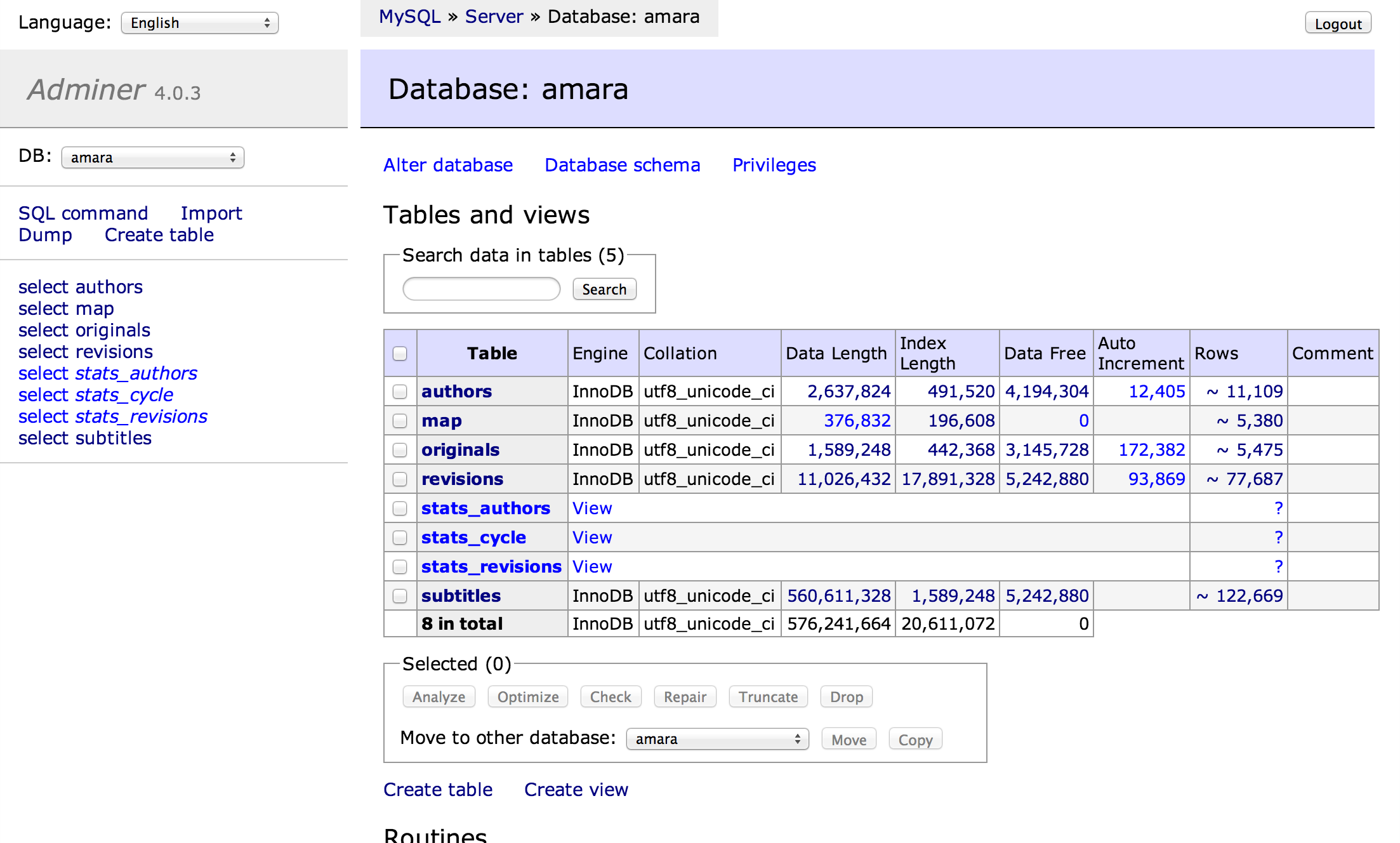
- Adminer main screen
- Developer: Jakub Vrána
- Initial release: 25 July 2007
- Stable release: 5.4.1 (26 September 2025; 2 months ago) [±]
- Repository: github.com/vrana/adminer
- Written in: PHP
- Available in: 42 languages
- Type: Database management system
- License: Apache license or GPL v2
- Website: www.adminer.org

Adminer (formerly known as phpMinAdmin) is a tool for managing content in databases. It natively supports MySQL, MariaDB, PostgreSQL, SQLite, MS SQL, Oracle, Elasticsearch and MongoDB. Adminer is distributed under Apache license (or GPL v2) in a form of a single PHP file (around 470 KiB in size). Its author Jakub Vrána started to develop this tool in July 2007 as a light-weight alternative to phpMyAdmin. Adminer got some attention in 2008 when it made it to the CCA finals at SourceForge. Also, first webhosting providers started to include Adminer as MySQL managing tool into their portfolio of services. In 2012 Adminer got coverage on Linux.com for the second time. The project's priorities, according to its author, are (in this order): safety, user-friendliness, performance, functionality, and size.

== Features ==
- Users log in specifying the destination server and providing the user name and password (which is stored during whole session)
- Basic functions: select database, select/edit tables, browse/insert/edit table rows
- Searching or sorting via multiple columns
- Editing of other database objects: views, triggers, events, stored procedures, processes, mysql variables, user permissions
- Text area for arbitrary SQL commands and storing these commands in command history
- Export of databases and tables (its structures and/or data) as a dump to output or a downloadable attachment
- User-friendly interface (extensive employment of JavaScript)
- Multiple language support (Arabic, Bengali, Catalan, Chinese, Czech, Dutch, English, Estonian, French, German, Greek, Hungarian, Italian, Indonesian, Japanese, Korean, Lithuanian, Persian, Polish, Portuguese, Romanian, Russian, Serbian, Slovak, Slovenian, Spanish, Tamil, Thai, Turkish, Ukrainian, Vietnamese)
- SQL syntax highlighting
- Visual database/E-R schema editing
- Countermeasures against XSS, CSRF, SQL injection, session-stealing, ...
- "Light-weight" – released in a form of a single file
- Support of CSS "skins", as well as many extensions

The small single file is a result of compilation and minification of source codes.

== See also ==
- Comparison of database tools
- phpMyAdmin
- MySQL
- PHP
