= Altova =

Software development company

- Company logo
- Company type: Private Subsidiary
- Industry: Computer software
- Founded: 1992
- Headquarters: Beverly, MA and Vienna, Austria
- Area served: Worldwide
- Key people: Alexander Falk
- Website: Altova homepage

Altova is a commercial software development company with headquarters in Beverly, MA, United States and Vienna, Austria, that produces integrated XML, JSON, database, UML, and data management software development tools.

== Company ==
Altova was founded in 1992 as an XML development software company. Its software is used by more than 4 million users and more than 100,000 companies globally. The first product was XMLSpy, and around the year 2000, Altova began to develop new tools to augment XMLSpy and expand into new areas of software development. The CEO and president of Altova is Alexander Falk, who has explained that the development of Altova software has occurred through the inclusion of features most requested by the users of previous program incarnations. Falk is also the inventor behind Altova's patents.

Altova software attempts to increase the efficiency of program use in order to reduce the amount of time needed for users to learn database software and other tasks such as query execution. Examples of Altova software includes the XML editor XMLSpy, and MapForce, a data mapping tool. Altova has also added XBRL capable programs to its XML software line, including development tools. In addition, they have included Web Services Description Language, project management and Unified Modeling Language capabilities to their software. Most recently, the company has introduced a mobile development environment called MobileTogether for developing cross-platform enterprise mobile solutions. At the beginning of 2014, the company claimed to have more than 4.6 million users of its software.

== Programs ==
- XMLSpy—XML editor for modeling, editing, transforming, and debugging XML technologies
- MapForce—any-to-any graphical data mapping, conversion, and integration tool
  - MapForce FlexText—graphical utility for parsing flat files
- StyleVision—multipurpose visual XSLT stylesheet design, multi-channel publishing, and report building tool
- UModel—UML modeling tool
- DatabaseSpy—multi-database data management, query, and design tool
- DiffDog—XML-aware file, directory, and database differencing tool
- SchemaAgent — graphical XML Schema, XSLT, WSDL and management tool
- Authentic—WYSIWYG XML authoring tool and database content editor
- MissionKit—Altova's integrated suite of XML, SQL, and UML software tools
- MobileTogether—Cross-platform mobile development environment for native apps for the enterprise
- FlowForce Server—Server software for managing automation of business processes
- RaptorXML Server—XML and XBRL server with support for XML validation, XBRL validation, and XSLT and XQuery processing

== See also ==
- XMLSpy
