= Oracle SQL Developer =

Free SQL IDE from Oracle Corporation

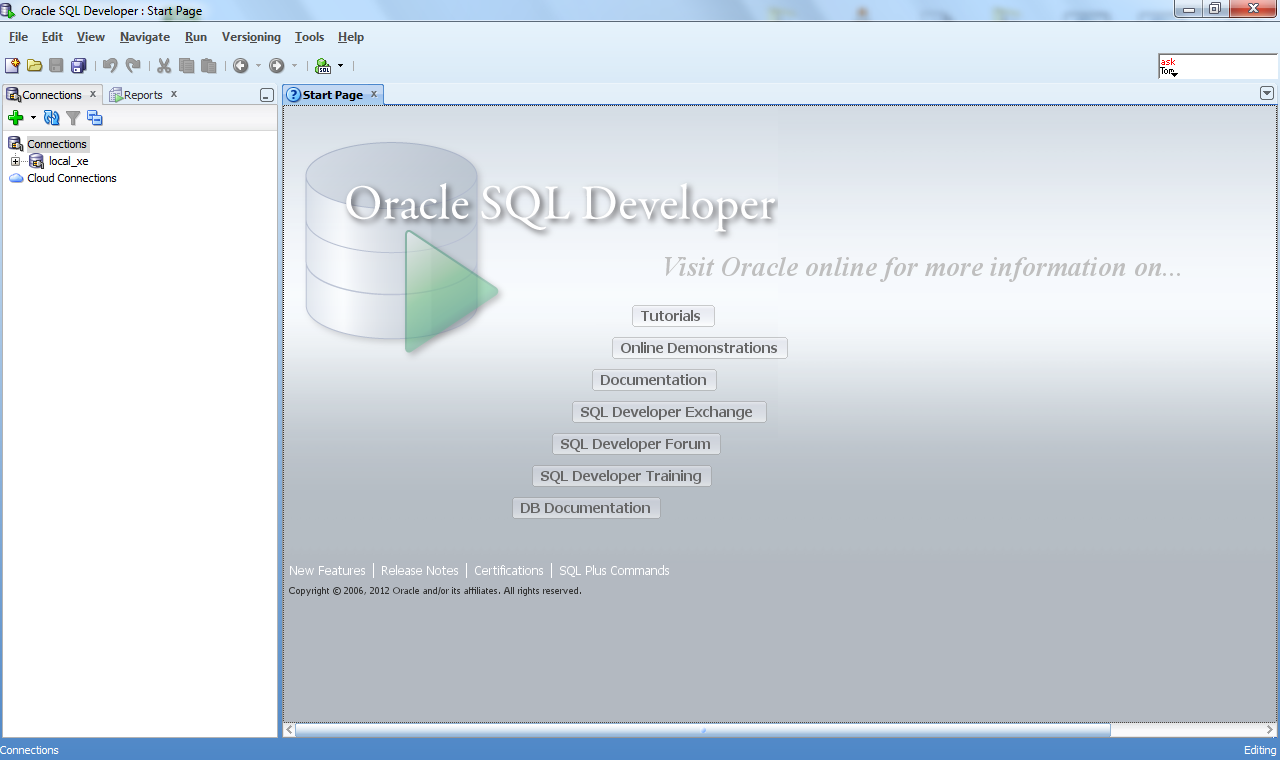
- Developer: Oracle Corporation
- Release: 2005; 21 years ago

Stable release(s) [±]
- VS Code extension: 26.2.0 / July 3, 2026; 13 days ago
- Standalone (discontinued): 26.2.0.186.2220 / July 14, 2026; 2 days ago
- Written in: Java
- Platform: Java SE
- Type: SQL Integrated development environment
- License: Proprietary
- Website: www.oracle.com/technetwork/developer-tools/sql-developer/

Oracle SQL Developer is an Integrated development environment (IDE) for working with SQL in Oracle databases. Oracle Corporation provides this product free; it uses the Java Development Kit.

== History ==
The SQL Developer product was initially created in response to a large invoice sent from Quest Software to Oracle Corporation over the use of Quest's TOAD product within Oracle's consulting group - Quest claimed that Oracle used the tool far more extensively than their license allowed for.

Larry Ellison personally called the lead developer during lunch early in 2006, stating that the payment just made to Quest in response to this (per Oracle's view) unwarranted license charge would be the last time Oracle paid the company for TOAD, and the developer was instructed to build a product that could replace it.

The initial release of SQL Developer was quickly put together, and released to Oracle internally immediately.

== Features ==
Oracle SQL Developer supports Oracle products. In the past a variety of third-party plugins were supported which users were able to deploy to connect to non-Oracle databases. Oracle SQL Developer worked with IBM Db2, Microsoft Access, Microsoft SQL Server, MySQL, Sybase Adaptive Server, Amazon Redshift and Teradata databases.

Oracle SQL Developer supports automatic tabs, code insight, bracket matching and syntax coloring for PL/SQL.

Future versions of Oracle SQL Developer will use Visual Studio Code.

== Components ==
Oracle SQL Developer product components include the OWA (Oracle Web Agent or MOD_PLSQL), an extension module for the Apache web server, and helps in setting up dynamic web-pages from PL/SQL within Oracle SQL Developer.

== Extensions ==
In addition to the extensions provided by Oracle, third parties have written extensions to add new features to SQL Developer and to integrate with other products:

Integration with other Oracle products

- SQL Developer Data Modeler operates with and models metadata. Prior to SQL Developer version 3, it constituted a separate (but integrated) free counterpart of SQL Developer. As of SQL Developer version 3 modeling became an integrated part of the overall tool. "Data Modeler" can produce (among other outputs) .dmd files.
- Data Miner

== History ==
Oracle SQL Developer versions
Version	Release date	Description
Releases prior to 1.0		Prior to version 1.0, Oracle Corporation labeled the product "Raptor"
1.0	March 2006	The first release
1.1	December 2006	
1.2.1	August 2007	
1.5	April 2008	
1.5.1	June 2008	
1.5.3	December 2008	
1.5.4	March 2009	
1.5.5	July 2009	
2.1 RC1	December 2009	
2.1 Patch 1	March 2010	
3.0	March 2011	
3.1	February 2012	
3.2	August 2012	APEX listener administration; UI enhancements; 12c database support; bug fixes
4.0	December 2013	
4.0.1	February 2014	
4.0.2	May 2014	
4.0.3	September 2014	
4.1.1	June 2015	
4.1.2	October 2015	Requires Java 8
4.1.3	December 2015	
4.1.5	September 2016	
4.2.0	April 2017	
17.2	July 2017	New version numbering system with year.quarter used.
17.4	Dec 2017	
18.1	April 2018	
18.2	July 2018	
18.3	October 2018	
18.4	January 2019	
19.1	April 2019	
19.2	August 2019	
19.4	December 2019	
20.2	June 2020	
20.4	January 2021	
20.4.1	February 2021	
21.2	August 2021	
21.4	December 2021	
21.4.2	January 2022	
22.2	June 2022	Requires Oracle Java 11
22.2.1	September 2022	
23.1	April 2023	
24.3	October 2024	Requires Oracle Java 17
24.3.1	December 2024	
26.2	July 2026	

== See also ==
- JDeveloper
- Oracle Developer Suite

== Bibliography ==
- Harper, Sue (October 20, 2009), Oracle SQL Developer 2.1 (1st ed.), Packt Publishing, p. 496, ISBN 978-1-84719-626-2
- Hotka, Dan (October 10, 2006), Oracle SQL Developer Handbook (1st ed.), McGraw-Hill, p. 230, ISBN 0-07-148474-4
