= MySQL Workbench =

Database design graphical tool

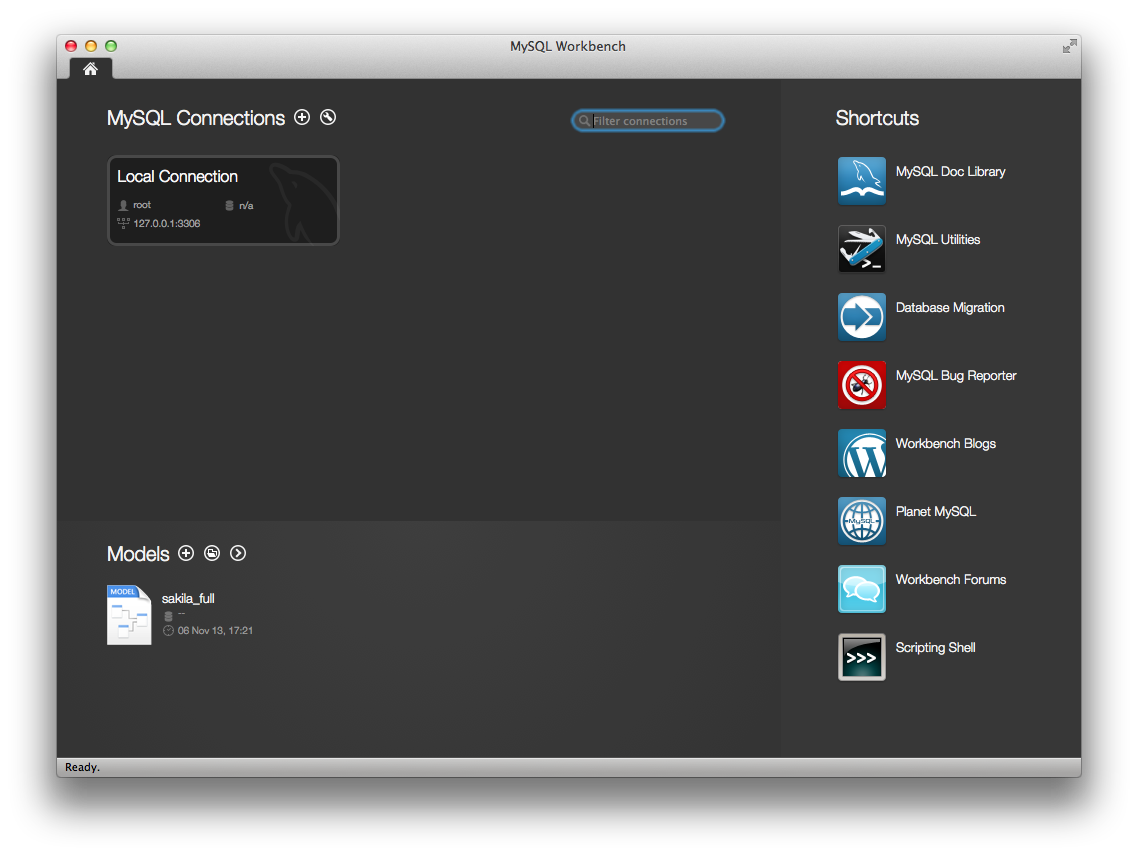
- The home screen
- Developer: Oracle Corporation
- Stable release: 8.0.47 / 2 April 2026; 5 months ago
- Written in: C++, C, Python
- Operating system: Windows, macOS and Linux
- License: Community ed.: GPL; Standard ed.: Commercial proprietary software
- Website: www.mysql.com/products/workbench/
- Repository: https://github.com/mysql/mysql-workbench

MySQL Workbench is a visual database design tool that integrates SQL development, administration, database design, creation and maintenance into a single integrated development environment for the MySQL database system. It is the successor to DBDesigner 4 from fabFORCE.net, and replaces the previous package of software, MySQL GUI Tools Bundle.

== History ==
=== fabFORCE.net DBDesigner4 ===
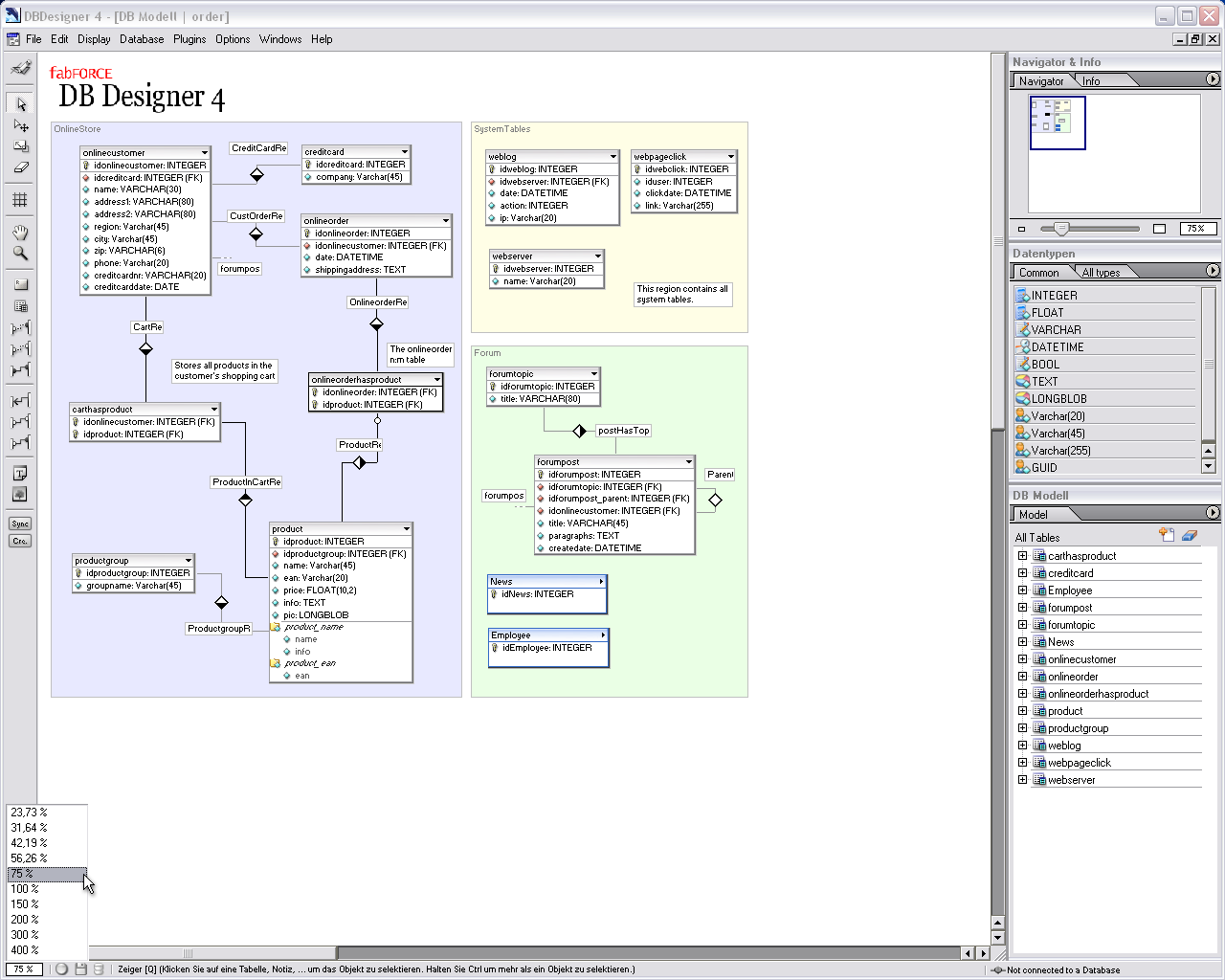
fabFORCE.net DBDesigner4

DBDesigner4 is an open source visual database design and querying tool for the MySQL database released under the GPL. It was written in 2002/2003 by the Austrian programmer Michael G. Zinner for his fabFORCE.net platform using Delphi 7 / Kylix 3.

While being a physical-modeling only tool DBDesigner4 offers a comprehensive feature set including reverse engineering of MySQL databases, model-to-database synchronization, model poster printing, basic version control of schema models and a SQL query builder. It is available for MS Windows, Mac OS X and Linux.

In late 2003, Zinner was approached by representatives from MySQL AB and joined the company to take over the development of graphical user interface (GUI) tools for MySQL. This led to the creation of the MySQL GUI Tools Bundle.

=== MySQL GUI Tools Bundle ===
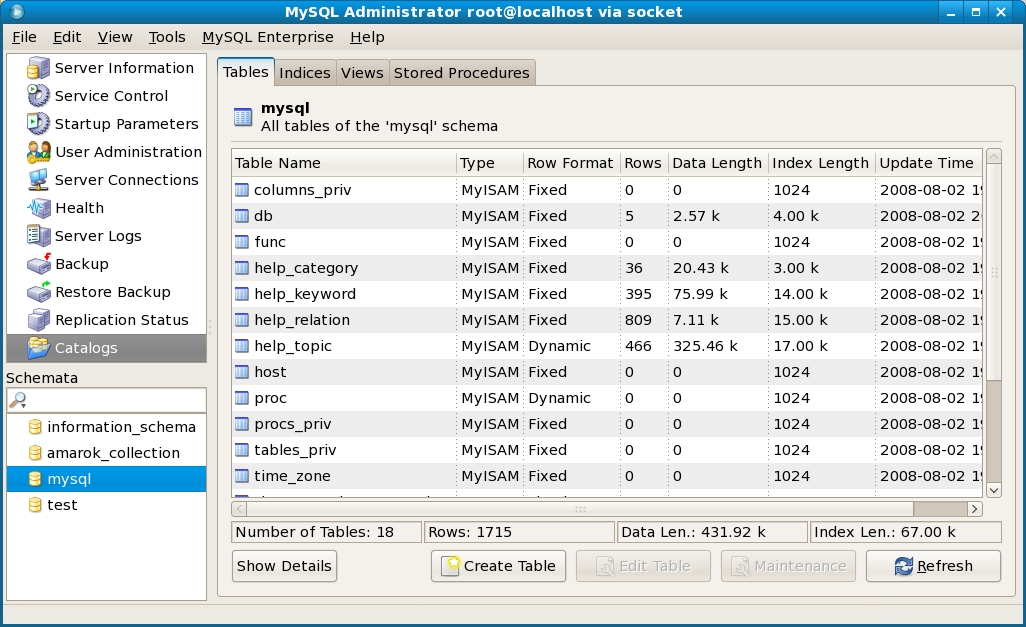
The MySQL Administrator part of GUI Tools

The MySQL GUI Tools Bundle is a cross-platform open source suite of desktop applications for the administration of MySQL database servers, and for building and manipulating the data within MySQL databases. It was developed by MySQL AB and later by Sun Microsystems and released under the GPL. Development on the GUI Tools bundle has stopped, and is now only preserved under the Download Archives of the MySQL site.

The GUI Tools bundle has been superseded by MySQL Workbench, and reached its End-of-Life with the beta releases of MySQL Workbench 5.2. However, the MySQL Support team continued to provide assistance for the bundle until June 30, 2010.

== Releases ==
The first preview version of MySQL Workbench was released in September 2005, and was not included in the MySQL GUI Tools Bundle. Development was started again in 2007 and MySQL Workbench was set to become the MySQL GUI flagship product.

Version numbering was started at 5.0 to emphasise that MySQL Workbench was developed as the successor to DBDesigner4.

=== MySQL Workbench 5.0 and 5.1 ===
MySQL Workbench 5.0 and 5.1 are specialized visual database design tools for the MySQL database. While MySQL Workbench 5.0 was a MS Windows-only product, cross-platform support was added to MySQL Workbench 5.1 and later.

=== MySQL Workbench 5.2 ===
Starting with MySQL Workbench 5.2 the application has evolved to a general database GUI application. Apart from physical database modeling it features an SQL Editor, database migration tools, and a database server administration interface, replacing the old MySQL GUI Tools Bundle.

=== MySQL Workbench 6.0 ===
On May 22, 2013, the MySQL Workbench Team announced that they were working on Version 6.0. The first public beta, labeled version 6.0.2, was released on June 14, 2013, and the first general-availability release was made on August 12, 2013.

=== MySQL Workbench 6.1 ===
On January 23, 2014 the MySQL Workbench Team announced its first public beta release of Version 6.1. The first general-availability release was made on March 31, 2014. New features include improved Visual Explain output, a Performance dashboard, Performance Schema support, additional query result views, and MSAA support.

=== MySQL Workbench 6.2 ===
On August 19, 2014, the MySQL Workbench Team announced its first public beta release of Version 6.2. The first general-availability release was made on September 23, 2014. New features are shortcut buttons for common operations, "pinning" of the results tab, Microsoft Access Migration, MySQL Fabric Integration, Spatial View Panel to visualize spatial and geometry data, Geometry Data Viewer, Result Set Width, SQL editor tabs are properly saved, Shared Snippets, a new Run SQL Script dialog, Model Script Attachments, Client Connections management has a new "Show Details" window where more information about connections, locks, and attributes is displayed, performance columns can display sizes in KB, MB, or GB, the migration wizard can resume operations of data copying if interrupted, MySQL connection password is remembered across the MySQL Workbench session.

=== MySQL Workbench 6.3 ===
On March 5, 2015, the MySQL Workbench Team announced its first public beta release of Version 6.3. The first general-availability release was made on April 23, 2015. New features include a "fast migration" option to migrate the data from the command-line instead of the GUI, a SSL certificate generator, improved SQL auto-completion, a new table data import and export wizard, and MySQL Enterprise Firewall support. Version 6.3.8, MySQL Workbench for MacOS has incompatibilities with MacOS Sierra. Version 6.3.9 is compatible with MacOS Sierra, however it doesn't work on MacOS High Sierra. MacOS High Sierra users need to run version 6.3.10.

=== MySQL Workbench 8.0 ===
On April 5, 2018, the MySQL Workbench Team announced the first public release of version 8.0.11 as a Release Candidate (RC) together with MySQL Community Server 8.0.11. The first General Availability (GA) release appeared on July 27, 2018 again together with the server following the new policy for aligning version numbers across most of MySQL products. MySQL Workbench now uses ANTLR4 as backend parser and has a new auto-completion engine that works with object editors (triggers, views, stored procedures, and functions) in the visual SQL editor and in models. The new versions add support for new language features in MySQL 8.0, such as common-table expressions and roles. There's also support for invisible indexes and persisting of global system variables. The new default authentication plugin caching_sha2_password in MySQL 8.0 is now supported by Workbench, so resetting user accounts to other authentication types is no longer necessary when connecting to the latest servers. Administrative tabs are updated with the latest configuration options and the user interface was made more consistent between the tabs.

As of 1 July 2024, the latest version is 8.0.38, but its syntax-checker is inconsistent with deprecation of the terms "master" and "slave" in favour of "source" and "replica" respectively in MySQL version 8.0.

=== MySQL Workbench 26 ===
Version 26 was released in September 2026. This version is build on top of Mysql Shell and has support for SQL notebooks and Visual Explain

== Features ==
Prominent features of MySQL Workbench are:

- General
  - Database Connection & Instance Management
  - Wizard driven action items
  - Fully scriptable with Python and Lua
  - Support for custom plugins
  - MSAA (Windows Accessibility API) compliant
  - Supports MySQL Enterprise features (Audit Log, Firewall, and Enterprise Backup)
- SQL Editor
  - Schema object browsing, inspection, and search
  - SQL syntax highlighter and statement parser
  - SQL code completion and context sensitive help
  - Multiple and editable result sets
  - Visual EXPLAIN
  - SQL snippets collections
  - SSH connection tunneling
  - Unicode support
- Data modeling
  - ER diagramming
  - Drag'n'Drop visual modeling
  - Reverse engineering from SQL Scripts and live database
  - Forward engineering to SQL Scripts and live database
  - Schema synchronization
  - Printing of models
  - Import from fabFORCE.net DBDesigner4
- Database administration
  - Start and stop of database instances
  - Instance configuration
  - Database account management
  - Instance variables browsing
  - Log file browsing
  - Data dump export/import
- Performance monitoring
  - Performance Schema metrics
  - MySQL instance dashboard
  - Query statistics
- Database migration
  - Any ODBC compliant database
  - Native support: Microsoft SQL Server, PostgreSQL, SQL Anywhere, SQLite, and Sybase ASE

== Licensing and editions ==
MySQL Workbench is the first MySQL family of products that offer two different editions - an open source and a proprietary edition. The "Community Edition" is a full featured product that is not crippled in any way. Being the foundation for all other editions it will benefit from all future development efforts. The proprietary "Standard Edition" extends the Community Edition with a series of modules and plugins.

As this business decision was announced soon after the takeover of MySQL by Sun Microsystems, this has caused speculation in the press about the future licensing of the MySQL database.

== Community reception and reviews ==
Since its introduction MySQL Workbench has become popular within the MySQL community. It is now the second most downloaded product from the MySQL website with more than 250,000 downloads a month. Before that it was voted Database Tool of the Year 2009 on Developer.com.

MySQL Workbench has been reviewed by the open source community and print magazines.

== See also ==
- Comparison of database tools
