= SESAM (database) =

SESAM / SQL Server is a relational database system originally developed by Siemens, whose role as developer was successively succeeded by Siemens Nixdorf Informationssysteme (SNI), Fujitsu Siemens Computers, and now Fujitsu Technology Solutions. It runs on the BS2000/OSD mainframe.

Clients running on BS2000/OSD, UNIX systems, Solaris, Linux and Microsoft Windows are supported.

== Features ==
- Support for SQL3
- Data can be stored in EBCDIC and Unicode
- Cost-based optimizer
- Maintenance is possible during operation
- Table partitioning
- Multi-platform support
- Apache web-server integration
