= SQL Server Management Objects =

Microsoft database programming feature

SQL Server Management Objects (SMO) are .NET objects introduced by Microsoft as of Microsoft SQL Server 2005, designed to allow for easy and simple programmatic management of Microsoft SQL Server.

Using SMO, .NET programmers can design applications similar in functionality to Microsoft's SQL Server Management Studio.

SMO objects comes with all SQL Server versions starting from SQL Server 2005 (2005, 2008, 2008R2, 2012, 2014, 2016). It is included in all SQL Server editions, including the Express Edition.
