= TOra =

TOra - Toolkit For Oracle

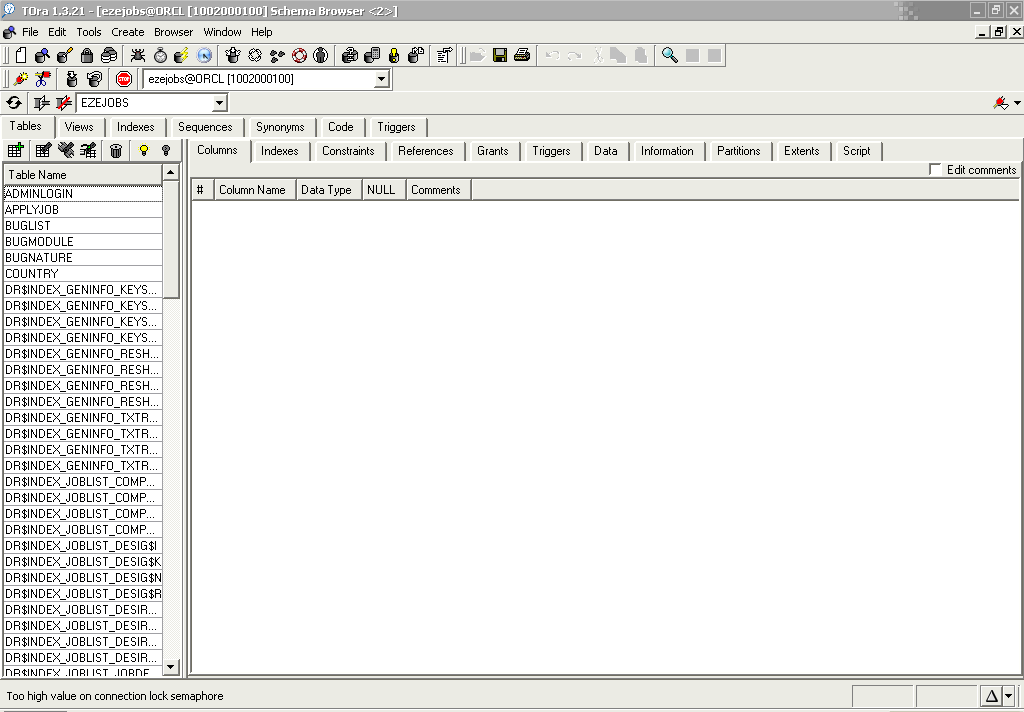
- TOra screenshot on Windows XP
- Developer: Community
- Initial release: 17 January 2001
- Stable release: 3.2.76 (October 24, 2017; 8 years ago) [±]
- Preview release: 2.1.4.4304 beta (May 9, 2012; 13 years ago) [±]
- Repository: github.com/tora-tool/tora; sourceforge.net/projects/tora/
- Written in: C++
- Available in: English
- Type: Database
- License: GPL
- Website: torasql.com

TOra (Toolkit for Oracle) is a free software database development and administration GUI, available under the GNU General Public License. It features a PL/SQL debugger, an SQL worksheet with syntax highlighting, a database browser and a comprehensive set of database administration tools.

In addition to Oracle Database support, support for MySQL, PostgreSQL and Teradata databases has been added since the initial launch.

It uses the Qt, and can use the qScintilla2 library. The Oracle connector uses the Oracle Template Library.

TOra was originally written by Henrik Johnson and copyright by GlobeCom AB, which was acquired by Quest Software.

Start of conversion to being maintained as open source project was made on 2005-02-17 with version 1.3.15.

QT4 conversion took place in 2009 with version 1.4.

== See also ==
- Comparison of database tools
