= XMLSpy =

XML and JSON editing integrated development environment

Altova XMLSpy
- XML editing in XMLSpy
- Developer: Altova
- Stable release: 2026 / October 21, 2025; 6 months ago
- Operating system: Microsoft Windows - officially supported
- Type: XML Editor
- License: EULA
- Website: www.altova.com/xmlspy-xml-editor

XMLSpy is a proprietary XML editor and integrated development environment (IDE) developed by Altova. XMLSpy allows developers to create XML-based and Web services applications using technologies such as XML, JSON, XBRL, XML Schema, XSLT, XPath, XQuery, WSDL and SOAP.

== Development ==
XMLSpy was first released in 1999, producing an integrated development environment for XML. It is a licensed software product that uses key protection to prevent unlicensed usage. Version 3.5 was released in 2000, allowing graphical input for editing diagrams and access to remote files. Version 4.1, released in 2001, added the capability to create XML schemas. The 5.0 version of the program was released in 2002, adding a XSLT processor, XSLT debugger, a WSDL editor, HTML importer, and a Java as well as C++ generator. The version's XML document editor was redesigned to allow for easier use by businesses. XMLSpy 2006 was given the Platinum Award by SQL Pro Magazine's Editor's choice awards. XMLSpy 2007 added increased XPath capabilities, including better integration with Microsoft Word.

In 2008 XMLSpy was the gold recipient in the Development Platform category by SQL Server Pro. In 2009 XMLSpy was named the Editors' Best Best Development Tool's Silver Award recipient by Windows IT Pro Magazine. XMLSpy 2010 added additional support for WSDL 2.0, as well as JSON editing. In 2011 the program added additional charting and graphing support, in addition to enhancing other program capabilities. In 2012 the new version added support for HTML5 and EPUB. The 2013 version then added new XML validation tools. The program also has support for XBRL, in order to manage and view XBRL data. Version 2014 includes support for XQuery Update Facility, with recent updates adding support for JSON Schema and Apache Avro.

== Multiple views ==
Altova XMLSpy includes multiple views and editing features for the following:

- AI Assistant
- XML instance document creation and editing
- JSON and JSON Schema editing & conversion
- YAML editing, validation, and conversion
- Visual XML Schema development
- DTD editing
- XSLT 1.0/2.0 development and debugging
- XQuery development and debugging
- XPath 1.0/2.0 development and analysis
- Office Open XML development
- XBRL taxonomy & instance document creation, editing, and validation
- Web services development
- Graphical WSDL creation and editing
- SOAP development and debugging
- Apache Avro visualization and schema editing
- Java, C++, C# code generation

== See also ==
- XML Notepad
