= SQLyog =

- Developer(s): Webyog, Inc.
- Stable release: 13.3.0 / 2024-07-23[±]
- Written in: C++
- Operating system: Microsoft Windows
- Size: 11.0MB
- Available in: English
- Type: Database administration tools
- License: Proprietary, GPL (Community Edition)
- Website: https://webyog.com

SQLyog is a GUI tool for the RDBMS MySQL. It is developed by Webyog, Inc., based in Bangalore, India, and Santa Clara, California. SQLyog is being used by more than 30,000 customers worldwide and has been downloaded more than 2,000,000 times.

== History ==
SQLyog v0.9 was first released to the public in 2001 after eight months of development. SQLyog was available free of charge, but with closed source code, until v3.0 when it was made a fully commercial software. Nowadays SQLyog is distributed both as free software as well as several paid, proprietary, versions. The free software version is known as Community Edition at GitHub. Paid versions are sold as Professional, Enterprise and Ultimate Editions.

== Features ==
Prominent features of SQLyog are:

- 64-bit binaries are available from version 11.0.
- Editor with syntax highlighting and various automatic formatting options
- Intelligent Code Completion
- Data manipulations (INSERT, UPDATE, DELETE) may be done from a spreadsheet-like interface. Both raw table data and a result set from a query can be manipulated.
- Visual Schema Designer
- Visual Query Builder
- Query Formatter
- Connectivity options: Direct client/server using MySQL API (SSL supported), HTTP/HTTPS tunneling, SSH tunneling
- Wizard-driven tool for import of data from ODBC-databases
- Backup Tool for performing unattended backups. Backups may be compressed and optionally stored as a file-per-table as well as identified with a timestamp.
- "SQL Scheduler and Reporting Tool" - a tool for scheduling and automating execution of any sequence of SQL statements. Result of queries may be sent as HTML-formatted reports.
- Schema/Structure Synchronization and Data Synchronization
- Query Profiler and Redundant Index Finder
- All automated jobs have mail alerting and reporting options.
- Full character set/Unicode support
- A "Data Search" feature using a Google-type search syntax translated transparently for user to SQL.
- Form view to display one row at a time
- Foreign key lookup
- Visual Data Compare

== Technical specification ==
- Programmed and developed in C++ using Win32 API. No dependencies on runtimes (.NET, Java etc.).
- Uses MySQL C API to communicate with MySQL servers. No dependencies on database abstraction layers (like ODBC/JDBC).
- Uses SQLite to store internal data like Grid settings. Consequently, these settings are persistent across sessions on a per-table basis.

== Platforms ==
SQLyog works on the Windows platform ranging from Windows Vista to Windows 10. (Windows 9x/ME support was removed in version 5.0, Windows 2000 support stopped with version 8.6, and Windows XP support ended with version 12.5.) It has also been made to work under Linux and various Unixes (including macOS) using the Wine environment. Further, a subset of SQLyog Enterprise/Ultimate functionalities are available with the free SJA (SQLyog Job Agent) for Linux as a native Linux utility. This makes it possible to specify and test "scheduled jobs" on a Windows environment and port execution parameters seamlessly to a Linux environment.

== Support ==
Webyog provides priority support to customers primarily through a ticket based support system. Users of Community Edition can get support through Webyog Forums which has more than 15000 registered users. Webyog also maintains an extensive FAQ for most commonly asked questions.

== See also ==
- Comparison of database tools
