= PhpLiteAdmin =

phpLiteAdmin
- main page of phpLiteAdmin showing the various table management actions possible
- Developers: Dane Iracleous, Ian Aldrighetti, George Flanagin, Christopher Kramer, Ayman Teryaki, 'Dreadnaut'
- Release: March 4, 2011
- Stable release: 1.9.8.2 / September 5, 2019; 7 years ago
- Written in: PHP
- Available in: 15 languages
- List of languages English, German, Russian, Chinese, Arabic, Italian, French, Portuguese, Czech, Spanish, Dutch, Greek, Polish, Slovak, Taiwanese
- Type: Database management system
- License: GNU General Public License
- Website: www.phpliteadmin.org
- Repository: bitbucket.org/phpliteadmin/public

phpLiteAdmin is an open-source tool written in PHP intended to handle the administration of SQLite over the World Wide Web. Its feature set, interface, and overall user experience is comparable to that of phpMyAdmin for MySQL. In the same way that SQLite is a flat file database, phpLiteAdmin is distributed in the form of a single PHP file (currently approx. 200 KiB in size). Its ease of installation, portability, and small size go hand in hand with SQLite.

== Features ==
- Lightweight - consists of a single source file
- Supports SQLite3 with Backward compatibility for SQLite2
- Add, delete, rename, empty, and drop tables
- Browse, add, edit, and delete rows
- Add, delete, and edit fields
- Manage table indexes
- Import and export tables, fields, indexes, and rows
- Search tool to find rows based on specified field values
- Create and run custom SQL queries in the free-form query editor
- Secure password-protected interface with login screen
- Specify and manage an unlimited number of databases
- Customize the look and feel with CSS

== See also ==
- Comparison of database tools
- SQLite
- phpMyAdmin
- PHP
