= Toad Data Modeler =

Database design tool

- Original author: Quest Software
- Stable release: 7.3 / October 19, 2020; 5 years ago
- Operating system: Windows
- Type: Database modeling tools
- Website: Official website

Toad Data Modeler is a database design tool allowing users to visually create, maintain, and document new or existing database systems, and to deploy changes to data structures across different platforms. It is used to construct logical and physical data models, compare and synchronize models, generate complex SQL/DDL, create and modify scripts, and reverse and forward engineer databases and data warehouse systems. Toad's data modelling software is used for database design, maintenance and documentation.

== Product History ==
Toad Data Modeler was previously called "CASE Studio 2" before it was acquired from Charonware by Quest Software in 2006. Quest Software was acquired by Dell on September 28, 2012. On October 31, 2016, Dell finalized the sale of Dell Software to Francisco Partners and Elliott Management, which relaunched on November 1, 2016 as Quest Software.

== Features/Usages ==
- Multiple database support - Connect multiple databases natively and simultaneously, including Oracle, SAP, MySQL, SQL Server, PostgreSQL, Db2, Ingres, and Microsoft Access.
- Data modelling tool - Create database structures or make changes to existing models automatically and provide documentation on multiple platforms.
- Logical and physical modelling - Build complex logical and physical entity relationship models and reverse, forward, and engineer databases.
- Reporting - Generate detailed reports on existing database structures.
- Model customization - Add logical data to user diagrams to customize user models.

All Toad products typically have 2 releases per year.

== Other features ==
- Model Actions (Compare Models, Convert Model, Merge Models, Generate Change Script)
- Version Control System (Apache Subversion)
- Naming Conventions
- Auto Layout
- Multiple Workspaces
- Scripting and Customization
- Automation
- Object Gallery
- Full Unicode Support
- Integration with Toad for Oracle

== Related Software ==
- Erwin Data Modeler
- Oracle
- SAP
- MySQL
- SQL Server
- PostgreSQL
- IBM Db2
- Ingres
- Microsoft Access

== See also ==
- Comparison of data modeling tools
- Relational Model
- Data modeling
- RDBMS
