= DbVisualizer =

- Developer: DbVis Software AB
- Release: 1999
- Written in: Java
- Operating system: Cross-platform
- Platform: Java
- Type: Database management
- Website: www.dbvis.com

DbVisualizer is a multi-platform database tool, founded in 2003 by DbVis Software AB, based in Stockholm, Sweden. It is a database management tool that connects to databases via a standardized protocol. The software connects to many relational and NoSQL database systems through JDBC. It runs on the Java Virtual Machine and works on Windows, macOS, and Linux. It is partly built on open-source technologies.

== History ==
Roger Bjärevall, the founder of DbVisualizer, started working on it in 1998. He released the first public version 1.0 in 1999. The tool received positive user feedback and high engagement, which led to the launch of DbVisualizer Pro in 2002, followed by the establishment of DbVis Software in 2003.

DbVis Software is currently led by Martin Engdahl, former director at Salesforce Sweden. In April 2020, Industrifonden and Fairpoint Capital invested €5.3 million in DbVis Software.

== Features ==
DbVisualizer has the following features:

- SQL Editor: Autocompletion, Syntax highlighting, Query formatting
- Database Object Navigation & Editing: Browse, view, and manage database objects like tables, schemas, etc
- Integrated AI Assistant: Optional access to external AI models via a simple chat interface for asking questions, writing and analyzing SQL, exploring schemas, and explaining errors
- Version control with Git: Integrated version control for scripts and connections using Git repositories such as GitHub
- Advanced Query Tools: Administrative capabilities for query analysis
- Import/Export: Facilitates data migration with built-in tools
- Command-Line Integration: Automation and Scripted Operations

== Supported Databases and Platforms ==
DbVisualizer works on Windows, Linux and macOS with identical functionality. It supports MySQL, MariaDB, Oracle, SQLServer, Cloudscape, Sybase, DB2, Azure Synapse Analytics, Cassandra, SAP DB, Informix, Instant DB, PostgreSQL, and many more.
