= SQL Server Management Studio =

Database management software application

- SSMS 22 showing a query, the results of the query (as a table), the Object Explorer and Github Copilot panes while connected to a SQL Server database engine instance. The interface is demonstrated in dark mode.
- Developer: Microsoft
- Release: 2005
- Stable release: 22.10.2 / September 28, 2026; 8 days ago
- Operating system: Microsoft Windows
- Available in: Chinese (Simplified), Chinese (Traditional), Czech, English (United States), French, German, Italian, Japanese, Korean, Polish, Portuguese (Brazil), Russian, Spanish, Turkish
- Website: learn.microsoft.com/ssms/sql-server-management-studio-ssms

Microsoft SQL Server Management Studio (SSMS) is a software application developed by Microsoft that is used for configuring, managing, and administering all components within Microsoft SQL Server. First launched with Microsoft SQL Server 2005, it is the successor to the Enterprise Manager in SQL 2000 or before. The tool includes both script editors and graphical tools which work with objects and features of the server.

A central feature of SSMS is the Object Explorer, which allows the user to browse, select, and act upon any of the objects within the server. It also shipped a separate Express edition that could be freely downloaded; however recent versions of SSMS are fully capable of connecting to and manage any SQL Server Express instance. Microsoft also incorporated backwards compatibility for older versions of SQL Server thus allowing a newer version of SSMS to connect to older versions of SQL Server instances. It also comes with Microsoft SQL Server Express 2012, or users can download it separately.

Starting from version 11, the application was based on the Visual Studio 2010 shell, using WPF for the user interface. Versions 18 and after are based on the Visual Studio 2017 Isolated Shell.

In June 2015, Microsoft announced their intention to release future versions of SSMS independently of SQL Server database engine releases.

Since version 21 SSMS is based on Visual Studio 2022 and is installed using the Visual Studio Installer.

== See also ==
- Comparison of database administration tools
- SQL Server Management Objects
