= Microsoft Azure SQL Database =

Managed cloud database

Azure SQL

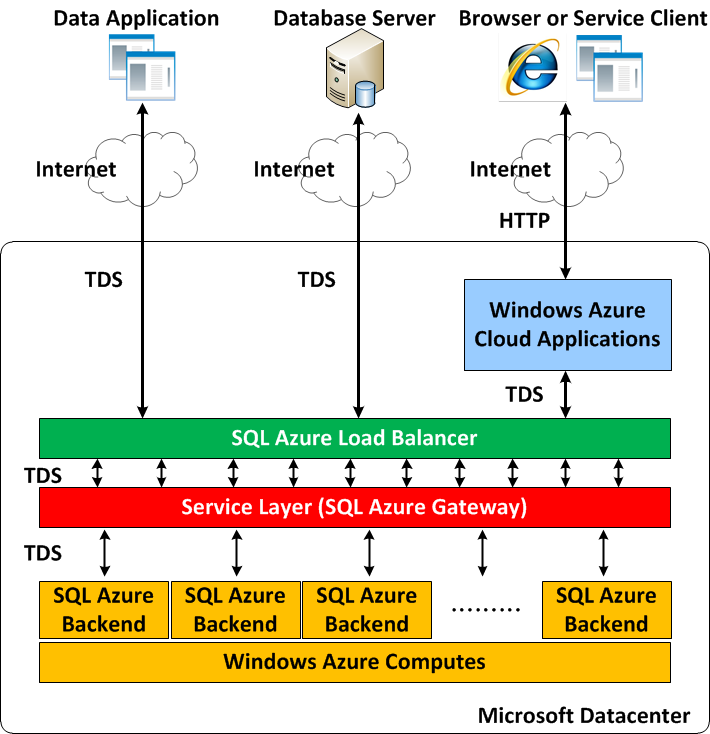
- Developer: Microsoft
- Initial release: 2010; 15 years ago
- Available in: English
- Type: Managed cloud database
- Website: https://azure.microsoft.com/en-us/products/azure-sql/

Microsoft Azure SQL Database (also described as SQL Server on Azure or Azure SQL; formerly known as SQL Azure, SQL Server Data Services, SQL Services, and Windows Azure SQL Database) is a managed cloud database (PaaS) cloud-based Microsoft SQL Servers, provided as part of Microsoft Azure services. The service handles database management functions for cloud based Microsoft SQL Servers including upgrading, patching, backups, and monitoring without user involvement.

== Overview ==
Azure SQL Database supports multi-modal storage of structured, semi-structured, and non-relational data.

Azure SQL Database includes built-in intelligence that learns app patterns and adapts them to maximize performance, reliability, and data protection.

Key capabilities include:

- Learning of the host app's data access patterns, adaptive performance tuning, and automatic improvements to reliability and data protection.
- Scaling on demand.
- Management and monitoring of multi-tenant apps with isolation benefits of one-customer-per-database.
- Integration with open-source tools such as cheetah (Command-line interface utility), sql-cli, Visual Studio Code, and Microsoft tools like Visual Studio, SQL Server Management Studio, Azure Management Portal, PowerShell, and REST APIs.
- Data protection with encryption, authentication, limiting user access to the subset of the data, continuous monitoring and auditing to help detect potential threats and provide a record of critical events in case of a breach.

== Popular use cases ==
- Relational data storage for cloud-based applications and websites
- Business and consumer web and mobile apps
- Manage databases for multi-tenant apps (software-as-a-service)
- Quickly create dev and test databases to speed up development cycles
- Scale production business services quickly and at a known cost
- Containerize data in the cloud for isolation and security
- Reduce database administration overhead through increased automation

== Design ==
Azure SQL Database is built on the foundation of the SQL server database and therefore, kept in sync with the latest version of it by using the common code base. Since the cloud version of the database technology strives to decouple it from the underlying computing infrastructure, it doesn't support some of the context specific T-SQL features available in the traditional SQL server. However, the rest of the features are the same with incompatibilities spelled out by Microsoft. Azure SQL Database is also similar to Microsoft's SQL Managed instance offering, with some differences.

== Timeline ==
- 2009 – Service announced
- 2010 – Service went live
- 2014 – New version announced and rebranded from Windows Azure to Microsoft Azure
- 2015 – Major Architectural Revision
- 2016 – Elastic Pools Introduced
- 2017 - Azure SQL Database Managed Instance launched
- 2019 - Introduced Azure SQL Database Hyperscale, Serverless, and Instance Pools

== Deployment Models ==
Azure SQL Database is offered in two deployment models, as a Standalone database or an Elastic database pool (with shared storage and compute resources).

== See also ==
- Microsoft Azure
- Oracle Cloud Platform
- SQL Server
- Amazon Relational Database Service
- Relational Database
- Cloud computing
- Software as a service
