= SQL Database Studio =

Database management software

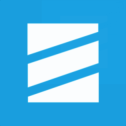

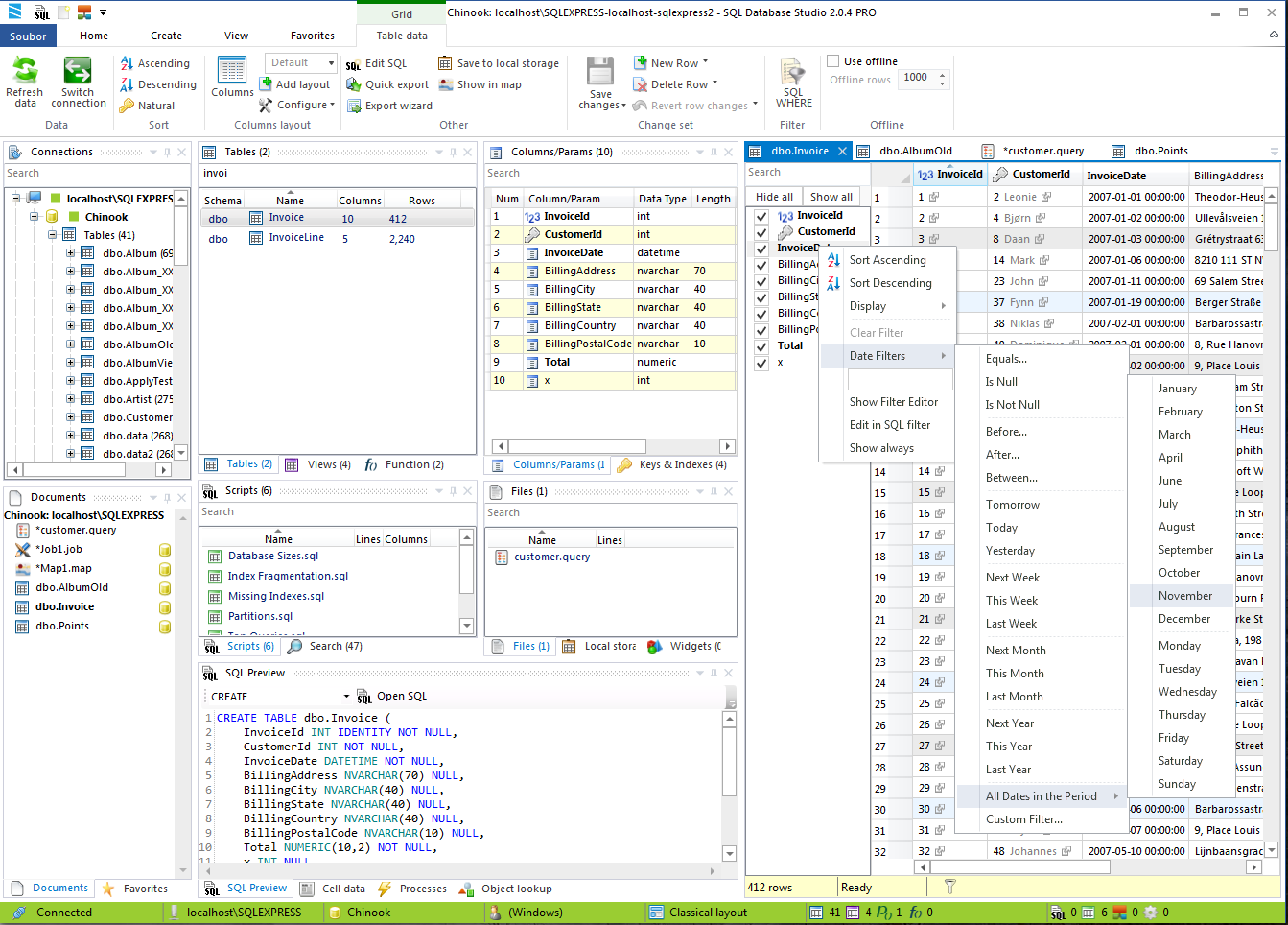
- Original author(s): Jan Prochazka
- Stable release: 3.6.2 / May 10, 2017; 7 years ago
- Written in: .NET WPF C#
- Operating system: Windows
- Available in: English
- Type: Database management
- Website: sqldatabasestudio.com

SQL Database Studio is professional client for Microsoft SQL Server developed by Jan Prochazka in Czech Republic. SQL Database Studio (SDS) is used by database developers for designing database and also by average users for browsing data. SDS comes in two version. EXPRESS version is free even for commercial purposes but lacks some features that are in PRO version. SDS allows visualization of GPS data. It is built using WPF application running on Microsoft .NET Framework 4.5.

== Feature summary ==
- GPS Visualization allows showing location data in map and exporting map
- SQL Query Designer
  - Support for SELECT, INSERT, UPDATE queries
  - Specific join operators - WHERE NOT EXISTS, CROSS APPLY, OUTER APPLY
- Database schema visualization
- Table column's filter
- Database projects
- SQL Editor with auto complete
- Run SQL commands in transaction
- Run SQL commands on multiple connections simultaneously
- Import and export to/from formats MS Excel, CSV, DBF
- Saving SQL scripts in projects not affecting database
- Database configuration with setting risk levels (Development database, production database)
- Data widgets (simple queries saved in database project, which are bind to some table, application than shows results of query while browsing table data)
- Database Jobs designer
- Switching between various GUI layouts
- DbShell Console is opensource project for database operation automation)

== Supported databases ==
- Microsoft SQL Server 2005, 2008, 2008R2,2012, 2014, 2016,2017,2019
