= FrontBase =

- Developers: FrontBase, Inc.
- Stable release: 8.2.6 / 15 December 2015; 10 years ago
- Operating system: Microsoft Windows, macOS, Linux
- Type: RDBMS
- License: FrontBase, Inc.
- Website: www.frontbase.com

FrontBase is a relational database management system written in ANSI C. FrontBase uses the Unicode character encoding.

== International standards ==
FrontBase complies with SQL 92 (fully compliant), Unicode (Unicode 2.0) and TCP/IP (uses sockets).

== Available platforms ==
FrontBase is available on the following platforms:

- Macintosh - Mac OS X, Mac OS X Server 10.x and Mac OS X Server 1.2
- Linux - RedHat, SuSE(Intel and Power PC), YellowDog Linux and Mandrake Linux
- Unix - FreeBSB, Solaris and HP-UX
- Windows - Windows NT and Windows 2000.

== Drivers and adaptors ==
Drivers and adaptors include Apple WebObjects, PHP3, PHP4, Perl, ODBC, JDBC, Omnis Studio, REALBasic, Tcl, EOF, FBAccess and FBCAccess.

== Data types ==
Data types supported include INTEGER, DECIMAL, TIMESTAMP, BLOB and VARCHAR.

== See also ==
- List of relational database management systems
- Comparison of relational database management systems
