= Toad (software) =

Database management software

TOAD
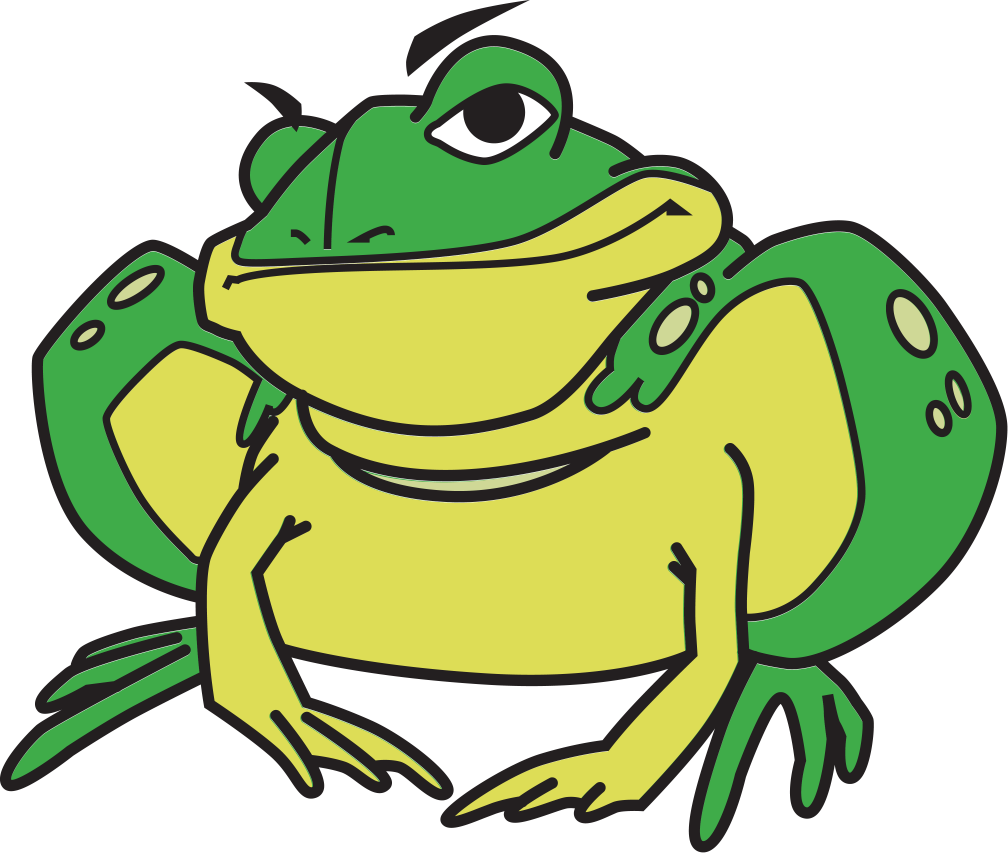
- Original author: Jim McDaniel
- Developer: Quest Software
- Written in: Various (depending on the database used)
- Type: Database management tools
- License: Proprietary
- Website: https://www.quest.com/toad/

Toad is a database management toolset from Quest Software for managing relational and non-relational databases using SQL aimed at database developers, database administrators, and data analysts. The Toad toolset runs against Oracle, SQL Server, IBM DB2 (LUW & z/OS), SAP and MySQL. A Toad product for data preparation supports many data platforms.

== History ==
A practicing Oracle DBA, Jim McDaniel, designed Toad for his own use in the mid-1990s. He called it Tool for Oracle Application Developers, shortened to "TOAD". McDaniel initially distributed the tool as shareware and later online as freeware.

Quest Software acquired TOAD in October 1998. Quest Software itself was acquired by Dell in 2012 to form Dell Software. In June 2016, Dell announced the sale of their software division, including the Quest business, to Francisco Partners and Elliott Management Corporation. On October 31, 2016, the sale was finalized. On November 1, 2016, the sale of Dell Software to Francisco Partners and Elliott Management was completed, and the company re-launched as Quest Software.

== Features ==
- Connection Manager - Allow users to connect natively to the vendor’s database whether on-premise or DBaaS.
- Browser - Allow users to browse all the different database/schema objects and their properties effective management.
- Editor - A way to create and maintain scripts and database code with debugging and integration with source control.
- Unit Testing (Oracle) - Ensures code is functionally tested before it is released into production.
- Static code review (Oracle) - Ensures code meets required quality level using a rules-based system.
- SQL Optimization - Provides developers with a way to tune and optimize SQL statements and database code without relying on a DBA. Advanced optimization enables DBAs to tune SQL effectively in production.
- Scalability testing and database workload replay - Ensures that database code and SQL will scale properly before it gets released into production.

== Books ==
- Toad Pocket Reference for Oracle plsql 1st Edition by Jim McDaniel and Patrick McGrath, O'Reilly, 2002 (ISBN 0596003374, ISBN 978-0-596-00337-1)
- Toad Pocket Reference for Oracle 2nd Edition by Jeff Smith, Bert Scalzo, and Patrick McGrath, O'Reilly, 2005 (ISBN 0596009712, ISBN 978-0-596-00971-7)
- TOAD Handbook by Bert Scalzo and Dan Hotka, Sams, 2003 (ISBN 0672324865, ISBN 978-0-672-32486-4)
- TOAD Handbook 2nd Edition by Bert Scalzo and Dan Hotka, Addison-Wesley Professional, 2009 (ISBN 0321649109, ISBN 978-0-321-64910-2).
- TOAD Handbook 2nd Edition by Bert Scalzo and Dan Hotka, Addison-Wesley Professional, 2009 (ISBN 0321649109, ISBN 978-0-321-64910-2).

== See also ==
- Comparison of database tools
