= PhpMyAdmin =

Database administration tool

phpMyAdmin

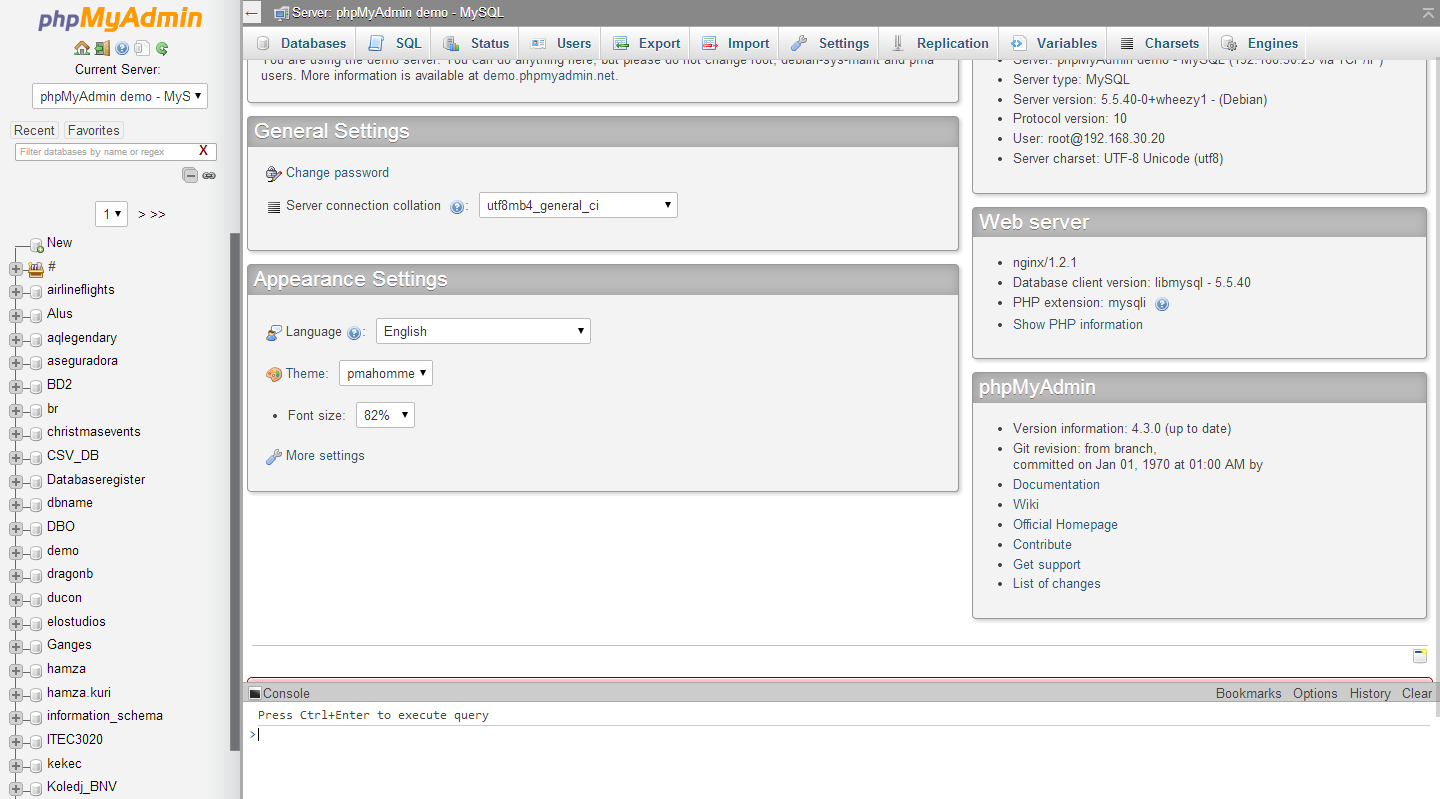
- phpMyAdmin main screen
- Developer: The phpMyAdmin Project
- Initial release: September 9, 1998; 27 years ago
- Stable release: 5.2.3 / 2025-10-08; 8 months ago[±]
- Preview release: 5.2.0-rc1 / January 22, 2022; 4 years ago
- Written in: PHP, JavaScript
- Operating system: Cross-platform
- Available in: 95 languages
- Type: Database management
- License: GNU General Public License 2
- Website: www.phpmyadmin.net
- Repository: https://github.com/phpmyadmin/phpmyadmin

phpMyAdmin is a free and open source administration tool for MySQL and MariaDB. As a portable web application written primarily in PHP, it has become one of the most popular MySQL administration tools, especially for web hosting services.

== History ==
Tobias Ratschiller, then an IT consultant and later founder of the software company Maguma, started to work on a PHP-based web front-end to MySQL in 1998, inspired by MySQL-Webadmin. He gave up the project (and phpAdsNew, of which he was also the original author) in 2000 because of lack of time.

By that time, phpMyAdmin had already become one of the most popular PHP applications and MySQL administration tools, with a large community of users and contributors. In order to coordinate the growing number of patches, a group of three developers (Olivier Müller, Marc Delisle and Loïc Chapeaux) registered The phpMyAdmin Project at SourceForge and took over the development in 2001.

In July 2015, the main website and the downloads left SourceForge and moved to a content delivery network. At the same time, the releases began to be PGP-signed. Afterwards, issue tracking moved to GitHub and the mailing lists migrated. Before version 4, which uses Ajax extensively to enhance usability, the software used HTML frames.

== Features ==
Features provided by the program include:

1. Web interface
2. MySQL and MariaDB database management
3. Import data from CSV, JSON and SQL
4. Export data to various formats: CSV, SQL, XML, JSON, PDF (via the TCPDF library), ISO/IEC 26300 - OpenDocument Text and Spreadsheet, Word, Excel, LaTeX, SQL, and others
5. Administering multiple servers
6. Creating PDF graphics of the database layout
7. Creating complex queries using query-by-example (QBE)
8. Searching globally in a database or a subset of it
9. Transforming stored data into any format using a set of predefined functions, like displaying BLOB-data as image or download-link
10. Live charts to monitor MySQL server activity like connections, processes, CPU/memory usage, etc.
11. Network traffic to the SQL server
12. Working with different operating systems like Windows*, Linux*, OS/2, Free BSD* Unix* (such as Sun* Solaris*, AIX) and others.
13. Make complex SQL queries easier.

== See also ==
- Comparison of database administration tools
