= Comparison of relational database management systems =

The following tables compare general and technical information for a number of relational database management systems. Please see the individual products' articles for further information. Unless otherwise specified in footnotes, comparisons are based on the stable versions without any add-ons, extensions or external programs.

== General information ==
| | Maintainer | First public release date | Latest stable version | Latest release date | License | Public issues list |
|---|---|---|---|---|---|---|
| 4D (4th Dimension) | 4D S.A.S. | 1984 | v16.0 | 2017-01-10 | Proprietary | No |
| ADABAS | Software AG | 1970 | 8.1 | 2013-06 | Proprietary | No |
| Adaptive Server Enterprise | SAP AG | 1987 | 16.0 SP03 PL07 | 2019-06-10 | Proprietary | No |
| Advantage Database Server (ADS) | SAP AG | 1992 | 12.0 | 2015 | Proprietary | No |
| Altibase | Altibase Corp. | 2000 | 7.1.0.1.2 | 2018-03-02 | Proprietary | No |
| Apache Derby | Apache | 2004 | 10.17.1.0 | 2023-11-14 | Apache License | Yes |
| ClustrixDB | MariaDB Corporation | 2010 | v7.0 | 2015-08-19 | Proprietary | No |
| CockroachDB | Cockroach Labs | 2015 | v25.4 | 2026-01-13 | BSL,CCL,MIT,BSD | Yes |
| CrateDB | Crate.io | 2013-04-15 | 6.4.0 | 2026-07-06 | Apache License 2.0 | Yes |
| CUBRID | CUBRID | 2008-11 | 11.2.3 | 2023-01-31 | Apache License 2.0, BSD license for APIs and GUI tools | Yes |
| Datacom | CA, Inc. | Early 70s | 14 | 2012 | Proprietary | No |
| IBM Db2 | IBM | 1983 | 12.1 | 2024-11-14; 22 months ago | Proprietary | No |
| Empress Embedded Database | Empress Software Inc | 1979 | 10.20 | 2010-03 | Proprietary | No |
| Exasol | EXASOL AG | 2004 | 7.1.1 | 2021-09-15; 5 years ago | Proprietary | No |
| FileMaker | FileMaker, Inc., an Apple subsidiary | 1985-04 | 19 | 2020-05-20 | Proprietary | No |
| Firebird | Firebird project | 2000-07-25 | 5.0.4 | 2026-04-17; 5 months ago | IPL and IDPL | Yes |
| GPUdb | GIS Federal | 2014 | 3.2.5 | 2015-01-14 | Proprietary | No |
| HSQLDB | HSQL Development Group | 2001 | 2.6.1 | 2021-10-21 | BSD | Yes |
| H2 | H2 Software | 2005 | 2.3.232 | 2024-08-12 | EPL and modified MPL | Yes |
| Informix Dynamic Server | IBM / HCL Technologies | 1980 | 15.0.0.1 | 2025-03-15 | Proprietary | No |
| Ingres | Actian(HCLSoftware) | 1974 | 12.0.0 | 2024-05-06 | Proprietary | No |
| InterBase | Embarcadero Technologies | 1984 | XE7 v12.0.4.357 | 2015-08-12 | Proprietary | No |
| Linter SQL RDBMS | RELEX Group | 1990 | 6.0.17.53 | 2018-02-15 | Proprietary | Yes |
| LucidDB | The Eigenbase Project | 2007-01 | 0.9.4 | 2012-01-05 | GPL v2 | No |
| MariaDB | MariaDB Community | 2010-02-01 | 13.0.2 | 2026-09-15; 27 days ago | GPL v2, LGPL (for client-libraries) | Yes |
| MaxDB | SAP AG | 2003-05 | 7.9.0.8 | 2014 | Proprietary | Yes |
| SingleStore (formerly MemSQL) | SingleStore | 2012-06 | 7.1.11 | 2020-10-12 | Proprietary | No |
| Microsoft Access (JET) | Microsoft | 1992 | 16 (2016) | 2015-09-22 | Proprietary | No |
| Microsoft Visual Foxpro | Microsoft | 1984 | 9 (2005) | 2007-10-11 | Proprietary | No |
| Microsoft SQL Server | Microsoft | 1989 | 2025 | 2025-11-18; 10 months ago | Proprietary | No |
| Microsoft SQL Server Compact (Embedded Database) | Microsoft | 2000 | 2011 (v4.0) | | Proprietary | No |
| Mimer SQL | Mimer Information Technology | 1978 | 11.0.9H | 2026-08-27 | Proprietary | No |
| MonetDB | MonetDB Foundation | 2004 | Dec2025 | 2025-12-16 | Mozilla Public License, version 2.0 | Yes |
| mSQL | Hughes Technologies | 1994 | 4.1 | 2017-06-30 | Proprietary | No |
| MySQL | Oracle Corporation | 1995-11 | 26.7.0 | 2026-07-28; 2 months ago | GPL v2 or Proprietary | Yes |
| NexusDB | NexusDB Pty Ltd | 2003 | 4.00.14 | 2015-06-25 | Proprietary | No |
| HPE NonStop SQL | Hewlett Packard Enterprise | 1987 | SQL/MX 3.4 | | Proprietary | No |
| NuoDB | NuoDB | 2013 | 4.1 | 2020-08 | Proprietary | No |
| Omnis Studio | TigerLogic Inc | 1982-07 | 6.1.3 Release 1no | 2015-12 | Proprietary | No |
| OpenEdge | Progress Software Corporation | 1984 | 12.8 | 2024-1 | Proprietary | No |
| OpenLink Virtuoso | OpenLink Software | 1998 | 7.2.14 | 2024-11-11 | GPL v2 or Proprietary | Yes |
| Oracle DB | Oracle Corporation | 1979-11 | 26ai | 2025-10-14; 11 months ago | Proprietary | No |
| Oracle Rdb | Oracle Corporation | 1984 | 7.4.1.1 | 2021-04-21[±] | Proprietary | No |
| Paradox | Corel Corporation | 1985 | 11 | 2009-09-07 | Proprietary | No |
| Percona Server for MySQL | Percona | 2006 | 8.0.37-29 | 2024-08-06[±] | GPL v2 | Yes |
| Picodata | Picodata | 2022 | 26.2.1 | 2026-09-01 | BSD | Yes |
| Actian Zen (PSQL) | Actian | 1982 | v16 | 2024-06-30 | Proprietary | No |
| Polyhedra DBMS | ENEA AB | 1993 | 9.0 | 2015-06-24 | Proprietary, with Polyhedra Lite available as Freeware | No |
| PostgreSQL | PostgreSQL Global Development Group | 1989-06 | 17.4 | 2025-02-21 | Postgres License | No |
| R:Base | R:BASE Technologies | 1982 | 10.0 | 2016-05-26 | Proprietary | No |
| SAP HANA | SAP AG | 2010 | 2.0 SPS04 | 2019-08-08 | Proprietary | No |
| solidDB | UNICOM Global | 1992 | 7.0.0.10 | 2014-04-29 | Proprietary | No |
| SQL Anywhere | SAP AG | 1992 | 17.0.0.48 | 2019-07-26 | Proprietary | No |
| SQLBase | Unify Corp. | 1982 | 11.5 | 2008-11 | Proprietary | No |
| SQLite | D. Richard Hipp | 2000-09-12 | 3.54.0 | 2026-10-09; 3 days ago | Public domain | Yes |
| SQream DB | SQream Technologies | 2014 | 2.1 | 2018-01-15 | Proprietary | No |
| Superbase | Superbase | 1984 | Classic | 2003 | Proprietary | No |
| Superbase NG | Superbase NG | 2002 | Superbase NG 2.10 | 2017 | Proprietary | Yes |
| Teradata | Teradata | 1984 | 15 | 2014-04 | Proprietary | No |
| TiDB | PingCAP Inc. | 2016 | 8.5.8 | 2026-08-27; 46 days ago | Apache License | Yes |
| UniData | Rocket Software | 1988 | 8.2.1 | 2017-07 | Proprietary | No |
| Vector | Actian(HCLSoftware) | 2010 | 7.0 | 2024-12-17 | Proprietary | No |
| VoltDB | Volt Active Data | 2010-05-25 | 13.2 | 2026 | AGPLv3 / proprietary | Yes |
| YugabyteDB | Yugabyte, Inc. | 2018 | 2.20.1.3 | 2024-01-25[±] | Apache License | Yes |
| Actian Zen (PSQL) | Actian | 1982 | v16 | 2024-06-30 | Proprietary | No |
| | Maintainer | First public release date | Latest stable version | Latest release date | License | Public issues list |

== Operating system support ==
The operating systems that the RDBMSes can run on.

| | Windows | macOS | Linux | BSD | UNIX | AmigaOS | z/OS | OpenVMS | iOS | Android |
|---|---|---|---|---|---|---|---|---|---|---|
| 4th Dimension | Yes | Yes | No | No | No | No | No | No | No | No |
| ADABAS | Yes | No | Yes | No | Yes | No | Yes | No | No | No |
| Adaptive Server Enterprise | Yes | No | Yes | Yes | Yes | No | No | No | No | No |
| Advantage Database Server | Yes | No | Yes | No | No | No | No | No | No | No |
| Altibase | Yes | No | Yes | No | Yes | No | No | No | No | No |
| Apache Derby | Yes | Yes | Yes | Yes | Yes | No | Yes | No | ? | No |
| ClustrixDB | No | No | Yes | No | Yes | No | No | No | No | No |
| CockroachDB | Yes | Yes | Yes | No | No | No | No | No | No | No |
| CrateDB | Yes | Yes | Yes | ? | Yes | No | No | No | No | No |
| CUBRID | Yes | Partial | Yes | No | No | No | No | No | No | No |
| IBM Db2 | Yes | Yes | Yes | No | Yes | No | Yes | No | Yes | No |
| Empress Embedded Database | Yes | Yes | Yes | Yes | Yes | No | No | No | No | Yes |
| EXASolution | No | No | Yes | No | No | No | No | No | No | No |
| FileMaker | Yes | Yes | Yes | No | No | No | No | No | Yes | No |
| Firebird | Yes | Yes | Yes | Yes | Yes | No | Maybe | No | Yes | Yes |
| HSQLDB | Yes | Yes | Yes | Yes | Yes | No | Yes | No | ? | ? |
| H2 | Yes | Yes | Yes | Yes | Yes | No | Yes | No | ? | Yes |
| Informix Dynamic Server | Yes | No | Yes | No | Yes (AIX) | No | No | No | No | No |
| Ingres | Yes | Yes | Yes | Yes | Yes | No | Partial | Yes | No | No |
| InterBase | Yes | Yes | Yes | No | Yes (Solaris) | No | No | No | Yes | Yes |
| Linter SQL RDBMS | Yes | Yes | Yes | Yes | Yes | No | Under Linux on IBM Z | Yes | Yes | Yes |
| LucidDB | Yes | Yes | Yes | No | No | No | No | No | No | No |
| MariaDB | Yes | Yes | Yes | Yes | Yes | No | No | No | ? | Yes |
| MaxDB | Yes | No | Yes | No | Yes | No | Maybe | No | No | No |
| Microsoft Access (JET) | Yes | No | No | No | No | No | No | No | No | No |
| Microsoft Visual Foxpro | Yes | No | No | No | No | No | No | No | No | No |
| Microsoft SQL Server | Yes | No | Yes | No | No | No | No | No | No | No |
| Microsoft SQL Server Compact (Embedded Database) | Yes | No | No | No | No | No | No | No | No | No |
| Mimer SQL | Yes | Yes | Yes | No | Yes | No | No | Yes | No | Yes |
| MonetDB | Yes | Yes | Yes | Yes | Yes | No | No | No | No | No |
| MySQL | Yes | Yes | Yes | Yes | Yes | Yes | Yes | No | ? | Yes |
| Omnis Studio | Yes | Yes | Yes | No | No | No | No | No | No | No |
| OpenEdge | Yes | No | Yes | No | Yes | No | No | No | No | No |
| OpenLink Virtuoso | Yes | Yes | Yes | Yes | Yes | No | No | No | No | No |
| Oracle | Yes | Yes | Yes | No | Yes | No | Yes | Yes | No | No |
| Oracle Rdb | No | No | No | No | No | No | No | Yes | No | No |
| Picodata | No | Yes | Yes | Yes | Yes | No | No | Yes | No | No |
| Actian Zen (PSQL) | Yes | Yes (OEM only) | Yes | No | No | No | No | No | Yes | Yes |
| Polyhedra | Yes | No | Yes | No | Yes | No | No | No | No | No |
| PostgreSQL | Yes | Yes | Yes | Yes | Yes | Yes (MorphOS) | Under Linux on IBM Z | No | No | Yes |
| R:Base | Yes | No | No | No | No | No | No | No | No | No |
| SAP HANA | Yes | No | Yes | No | No | No | No | No | No | No |
| solidDB | Yes | No | Yes | No | Yes | No | Under Linux on IBM Z | No | No | No |
| SQL Anywhere | Yes | Yes | Yes | No | Yes | No | No | No | No | Yes |
| SQLBase | Yes | No | Yes | No | No | No | No | No | No | No |
| SQLite | Yes | Yes | Yes | Yes | Yes | Yes | Maybe | No | Yes | Yes |
| SQream DB | No | No | Yes | No | No | No | No | No | No | No |
| Superbase | Yes | No | No | No | No | Yes | No | No | No | No |
| Superbase NG | Yes | No | Yes | No | No | No | No | No | No | No |
| Teradata | Yes | No | Yes | No | Yes | No | No | No | No | No |
| TiDB | Yes | Yes | Yes | Partial | No | No | No | No | No | No |
| UniData | Yes | No | Yes | No | Yes | No | No | No | No | No |
| UniVerse | Yes | No | Yes | No | Yes | No | No | No | No | No |
| VoltDB | ? | Yes | Yes | ? | Yes | No | No | No | No | No |
| YugabyteDB | Yes | Yes | Yes | No | No | No | No | No | No | No |
| | Windows | macOS | Linux | BSD | UNIX | AmigaOS | z/OS | OpenVMS | iOS | Android |

== Fundamental features ==
Information about what fundamental RDBMS features are implemented natively.

| Database Name | ACID | Referential integrity | Transactions | Fine-grained locking | Multiversion concurrency control | Unicode | Interface | Type inference |
|---|---|---|---|---|---|---|---|---|
| 4th Dimension | Yes | Yes | Yes | ? | ? | Yes | GUI & SQL | Yes |
| ADABAS | Yes | No | Yes | ? | ? | Yes | proprietary direct call & SQL (via 3rd party) | Yes |
| Adaptive Server Enterprise | Yes | Yes | Yes | Yes (Row-level locking) | Yes | Yes | API & GUI & SQL | Yes |
| Advantage Database Server | Yes | Yes | Yes | Yes (Row-level locking) | ? | Yes^{4} | API & SQL | Yes |
| Altibase | Yes | Yes | Yes | Yes (Row-level locking) | ? | Yes | API & GUI & SQL | Yes |
| Apache Derby | Yes | Yes | Yes | Yes (Row-level locking) | ? | Yes | SQL | Yes |
| ClustrixDB | Yes | Yes | Yes | Yes | Yes | Yes | SQL | Yes |
| CockroachDB | Yes | Yes | Yes | Yes (Row-level locking) | Yes | Yes | SQL | No |
| CUBRID | Yes | Yes | Yes | Yes (Row-level locking) | Yes | Yes | GUI & SQL | Yes |
| IBM Db2 | Yes | Yes | Yes | Yes (Row-level locking) | ? | Yes | GUI & SQL | Yes |
| Empress Embedded Database | Yes | Yes | Yes | ? | ? | Yes | API & SQL | Yes |
| EXASolution | Yes | Yes | Yes | ? | ? | Yes | API & GUI & SQL | Yes |
| Firebird | Yes | Yes | Yes | ? | Yes | Yes | API & SQL | Yes |
| HSQLDB | Yes | Yes | Yes | ? | Yes | Yes | SQL | Yes |
| H2 | Yes | Yes | Yes | ? | Yes | Yes | SQL | Yes |
| Informix Dynamic Server | Yes | Yes | Yes | Yes (Row-level locking) | Yes | Yes | SQL, REST, MQ, and JSON | Yes |
| Ingres | Yes | Yes | Yes | Yes (Row-level locking) | Yes | Yes | SQL & QUEL | Yes |
| InterBase | Yes | Yes | Yes | ? | ? | Yes | SQL | Yes |
| Linter SQL RDBMS | Yes | Yes | Yes (Except for DDL) | Yes (Row-level locking) | ? | Yes | API & GUI & SQL | Yes |
| LucidDB | Yes | No | No | ? | ? | Yes | SQL | Yes |
| MariaDB | Yes^{2} | Yes | Yes^{2} except for DDL | Yes (Row-level locking) | Yes | Yes | SQL | Yes |
| MaxDB | Yes | Yes | Yes | ? | ? | Yes | SQL | Yes |
| Microsoft Access (JET) | Yes | Yes | Yes | ? | ? | Yes | GUI & SQL | Yes |
| Microsoft Visual FoxPro | Yes | Yes | Yes | Yes (Row-level locking SMB2) | Yes | No | GUI & SQL | Yes |
| Microsoft SQL Server | Yes | Yes | Yes | Yes (Row-level locking) | Yes | Yes | GUI & SQL | Yes |
| Microsoft SQL Server Compact (Embedded Database) | Yes | Yes | Yes | ? | ? | Yes | GUI & SQL | Yes |
| Mimer SQL | Yes | Yes | Yes | Yes (Optimistic locking) | Yes | Yes | API & GUI & SQL | Yes |
| MonetDB | Yes | Yes | Yes | ? | ? | Yes | API & SQL & MAL | Yes |
| MySQL | Yes^{2} | Yes^{3} | Yes^{2} except for DDL | Yes (Row-level locking) | Yes | Yes | GUI ^{5} & SQL | Yes |
| OpenEdge | Yes | Yes^{6} | Yes | Yes (Row-level locking) | ? | Yes | GUI & SQL | Yes |
| OpenLink Virtuoso | Yes | Yes | Yes | ? | ? | Yes | API & GUI & SQL | Yes |
| Oracle | Yes | Yes | Yes except for DDL | Yes (Row-level locking) | Yes | Yes | API & GUI & SQL | Yes |
| Oracle Rdb | Yes | Yes | Yes | ? | ? | Yes | SQL | Yes |
| Actian Zen (PSQL) | Yes | Yes | Yes | ? | ? | Yes | API & GUI & SQL | Yes |
| Polyhedra DBMS | Yes | Yes | Yes | Yes (optimistic and pessimistic cell-level locking) | ? | Yes | API & SQL | Yes |
| PostgreSQL | Yes | Yes | Yes | Yes (Row-level locking) | Yes | Yes | API & GUI & SQL | No |
| SAP HANA | Yes | Yes | Yes | Yes (Row-level locking) | Yes | Yes | API & GUI & SQL | Yes |
| solidDB | Yes | Yes | Yes | Yes (Row-level locking) | ? | Yes | API & SQL | Yes |
| SQL Anywhere | Yes | Yes | Yes | Yes (Row-level locking) | Yes | Yes | API & GUI & HTTP(S) (REST & SOAP) & SQL | Yes |
| SQLBase | Yes | Yes | Yes | ? | ? | Yes | API & GUI & SQL | Yes |
| SQLite | Yes | Yes | Yes | No (Database-level locking) | No | Optional | API & SQL | Yes |
| Superbase NG | ? | ? | ? | Yes (Record-level locking) | ? | Yes | GUI & Proprietary & ODBC | Yes |
| Teradata | Yes | Yes | Yes | Yes (Hash and Partition) | ? | Yes | SQL | Yes |
| TiDB | Yes | Yes | Yes except for DDL | Yes (Row-level locking) | Yes | Yes | GUI ^{5} & SQL | Yes |
| UniData | Yes | No | Yes | ? | ? | Yes | Multiple | Yes |
| UniVerse | Yes | No | Yes | ? | ? | Yes | Multiple | Yes |
| Database Name | ACID | Referential integrity | Transactions | Fine-grained locking | Multiversion concurrency control | Unicode | Interface | Type inference |

- Note (1): Currently only supports read uncommitted transaction isolation. Version 1.9 adds serializable isolation and version 2.0 will be fully ACID compliant.
- Note (2): MariaDB and MySQL provide ACID compliance through the default InnoDB storage engine.
- Note (3): "For other than InnoDB storage engines, MySQL Server parses and ignores the FOREIGN KEY and REFERENCES syntax in CREATE TABLE statements." "The CHECK clause (as of 8.0.16) supports most core features for all storage engines."
- Note (4): Support for Unicode is new in version 10.0.
- Note (5): MySQL provides GUI interface through MySQL Workbench.
- Note (6): OpenEdge SQL database engine uses Referential Integrity, OpenEdge ABL Database engine does not and is handled via database triggers.

== Limits ==
Information about data size limits.

| | Max DB size | Max table size | Max row size | Max columns per row | Max Blob/Clob size | Max CHAR size | Max NUMBER size | Min DATE value | Max DATE value | Max column name size |
|---|---|---|---|---|---|---|---|---|---|---|
| 4th Dimension | Limited | ? | ? | 65,135 | 200 GB (2 GiB Unicode) | 200 GB (2 GiB Unicode) | 64 bits | ? | ? | ? |
| Advantage Database Server | Unlimited | 16 EiB | 65,530 B | 65,135 / (10+ AvgFieldNameLength) | 4 GiB | ? | 64 bits | ? | ? | 128 |
| Apache Derby | Unlimited | Unlimited | Unlimited | 1,012 (5,000 in views) | 2,147,483,647 chars | 254 (VARCHAR: 32,672) | 64 bits | 0001-01-01 | 9999-12-31 | 128 |
| ClustrixDB | Unlimited | Unlimited | 64 MB on Appliance, 4 MB on AWS | ? | 64 MB | 64 MB | 64 MB | 0001-01-01 | 9999-12-31 | 254 |
| CUBRID | 2 EB | 2 EB | Unlimited | Unlimited | Unlimited | 1 GB | 64 bits | 0001-01-01 | 9999-12-31 | 254 |
| IBM DB2 | Unlimited | 2 ZB | 1,048,319 B | 1,012 | 2 GB | 32 KiB | 64 bits | 0001-01-01 | 9999-12-31 | 128 |
| Empress Embedded Database | Unlimited | 2^{63}−1 bytes | 2 GB | 32,767 | 2 GB | 2 GB | 64 bits | 0000-01-01 | 9999-12-31 | 32 |
| EXASolution | Unlimited | Unlimited | Unlimited | 10,000 | —N/a | 2 MB | 128 bits | 0001-01-01 | 9999-12-31 | 256 |
| FileMaker | 8 TB | 8 TB | 8 TB | 256,000,000 | 4 GB | 10,000,000 | 1 billion characters, 10^{−400} to 10^{400}, ± | 0001-01-01 | 4000-12-31 | 100 |
| Firebird | Unlimited^{1} | ≈32 TB | 65,536 B | Depends on data types used | 32 GB | 32,767 B | 128 bits | 100 | 32768 | 63 |
| HSQLDB | 64 TB | Unlimited^{8} | Unlimited^{8} | Unlimited^{8} | 64 TB^{7} | Unlimited^{8} | Unlimited^{8} | 0001-01-01 | 9999-12-31 | 128 |
| H2 | 64 TB | Unlimited^{8} | Unlimited^{8} | Unlimited^{8} | 64 TB^{7} | Unlimited^{8} | 64 bits | -99999999 | 99999999 | Unlimited^{8} |
| | Max DB size | Max table size | Max row size | Max columns per row | Max Blob/Clob size | Max CHAR size | Max NUMBER size | Min DATE value | Max DATE value | Max column name size |
| Informix Dynamic Server | ≈0.5 YB^{12} | ≈0,5YB^{12} | 32,765 bytes (exclusive of large objects) | 32,765 | 4 TB | 32,765^{14} | 10^{125} ^{13} | 01/01/0001^{10} | 12/31/9999 | 128 bytes |
| Ingres | Unlimited | Unlimited | 256 KB | 1,024 | 2 GB | 32 000 B | 64 bits | 0001 | 9999 | 256 |
| InterBase | Unlimited^{1} | ≈32 TB | 65,536 B | Depends on data types used | 2 GB | 32,767 B | 64 bits | 100 | 32768 | 31 |
| Linter SQL RDBMS | Unlimited | 2^{30} rows | 64 KB (w/o BLOBs), 2GB (each BLOB value) | 250 | 2 GB | 4000 B | 64 bits | 0001-01-01 | 9999-12-31 | 66 |
| MariaDB | Unlimited | MyISAM storage limits: 256 TB; Innodb storage limits: 64 TB; Aria storage limits: ??? | 64 KB^{3} | 4,096^{4} | 4 GB (longtext, longblob) | 64 KB (text) | 64 bits | 1000 | 9999 | 64 |
| Microsoft Access (JET) | 2 GB | 2 GB | 16 MB | 255 | 64 KB (memo field), 1 GB ("OLE Object" field) | 255 B (text field) | 32 bits | 0100 | 9999 | 64 |
| Microsoft Visual Foxpro | Unlimited | 2 GB | 65,500 B | 255 | 2 GB | 16 MB | 32 bits | 0001 | 9999 | 10 |
| Microsoft SQL Server | 524,272 TB (32 767 files × 16 TB max file size) 16ZB per instance | 524,272 TB | 8,060 bytes / 2 TB^{6} | 1,024 / 30,000(with sparse columns) | 2 GB / Unlimited (using RBS/FILESTREAM object) | 2 GB^{6} | 126 bits^{2} | 0001 | 9999 | 128 |
| Microsoft SQL Server Compact (Embedded Database) | 4 GB | 4 GB | 8,060 bytes | 1024 | 2 GB | 4000 | 154 bits | 0001 | 9999 | 128 |
| Mimer SQL | Unlimited | Unlimited | 16000 (+lob data) | 252 | Unlimited | 15000 | 45 digits | 0001-01-01 | 9999-12-31 | 128 |
| MonetDB | Unlimited | Unlimited | Unlimited | Unlimited | 2 GB | 2 GB | 128 bits | -4712-01-01 | 9999-12-31 | 1024 |
| MySQL | Unlimited | MyISAM storage limits: 256 TB; Innodb storage limits: 64 TB | 64 KB^{3} | 4,096^{4} | 4 GB (longtext, longblob) | 64 KB (text) | 64 bits | 1000 | 9999 | 64 |
| OpenLink Virtuoso | 32 TB per instance (Unlimited via elastic cluster) | DB size (or 32 TB) | 4 KB | 200 | 2 GB | 2 GB | 2^{31} | 0 | 9999 | 100 |
| Oracle | 2 PB (with standard 8k block); 8 PB (with max 32k block); 8 EB (with max 32k block and BIGFILE option) | 4 GB × block size (with BIGFILE tablespace) | 8 KB | 1,000 | 128 TB | 32,767 B^{11} | 126 bits | −4712 | 9999 | 128 |
| | Max DB size | Max table size | Max row size | Max columns per row | Max Blob/Clob size | Max CHAR size | Max NUMBER size | Min DATE value | Max DATE value | Max column name size |
| Actian Zen (PSQL) | 4 billion objects | 256 GB | 2 GB | 1,536 | 2 GB | 8,000 bytes | 64 bits | 01-01-0001 | 12-31-9999 | 128 bytes |
| Polyhedra | Limited by available RAM, address space | 2^{32} rows | Unlimited | 65,536 | 4 GB (subject to RAM) | 4 GB (subject to RAM) | 64 bits | 0001-01-01 | 8000-12-31 | 255 |
| PostgreSQL | Unlimited | 32 TB | 1.6 TB | 250–1600 depending on type | 1 GB (text, bytea) stored inline or 4 TB using pg_largeobject | 1 GB | Unlimited | −4,713 | 5,874,897 | 63 |
| SAP HANA | ? | ? | ? | ? | ? | ? | ? | ? | ? | ? |
| solidDB | 256 TB | 256 TB | 32 KB + BLOB data | Limited by row size | 4 GB | 4 GB | 64 bits | -32768-01-01 | 32767-12-31 | 254 |
| SQL Anywhere | 104 TB (13 files, each file up to 8 TB (32 KB pages)) | Limited by file size | Limited by file size | 45,000 | 2 GB | 2 GB | 64 bits | 0001-01-01 | 9999-12-31 | 128 bytes |
| SQLite | 128 TB (2^{31} pages × 64 KB max page size) | Limited by file size | Limited by file size | 32,767 | 2 GB | 2 GB | 64 bits | No DATE type^{9} | No DATE type^{9} | Unlimited |
| Teradata | Unlimited | Unlimited | 64000 wo/lobs (64 GB w/lobs) | 2,048 | 2 GB | 64,000 | 38 digits | 0001-01-01 | 9999-12-31 | 128 |
| UniVerse | Unlimited | Unlimited | Unlimited | Unlimited | Unlimited | Unlimited | Unlimited | Unlimited | Unlimited | Unlimited |
| | Max DB size | Max table size | Max row size | Max columns per row | Max Blob/Clob size | Max CHAR size | Max NUMBER size | Min DATE value | Max DATE value | Max column name size |

- Note (1): Firebird 2.x maximum database size is effectively unlimited with the largest known database size >980 GB. Firebird 1.5.x maximum database size: 32 TB.
- Note (2): Limit is 10^{38} using DECIMAL datatype.
- Note (3): InnoDB is limited to 8,000 bytes (excluding VARBINARY, VARCHAR, BLOB, or TEXT columns).
- Note (4): InnoDB is limited to 1,017 columns.
- Note (6): Using VARCHAR (MAX) in SQL 2005 and later.
- Note (7): When using a page size of 32 KB, and when BLOB/CLOB data is stored in the database file.
- Note (8): Java array size limit of 2,147,483,648 (2^{31}) objects per array applies. This limit applies to number of characters in names, rows per table, columns per table, and characters per CHAR/VARCHAR.
- Note (9): Despite the lack of a date datatype, SQLite does include date and time functions, which work for timestamps between 24 November 4714 B.C. and 1 November 5352.
- Note (10): Informix DATETIME type has adjustable range from YEAR only through 1/10000th second. DATETIME date range is 0001-01-01 00:00:00.00000 through 9999-12-31 23:59:59.99999.
- Note (11): Since version 12c. Earlier versions support up to 4000 B.
- Note (12): The 0.5 YB limit refers to the storage limit of a single Informix server instance beginning with v15.0. Informix v12.10 and later versions support using sharding techniques to distribute a table across multiple server instances. A distributed Informix database has no upper limit on table or database size.
- Note (13): Informix DECIMAL type supports up to 32 decimal digits of precision with a range of 10^{−130} to 10^{125}. Fixed and variable precision are supported.
- Note (14): The LONGLVARCHAR type supports strings up to 4TB.

== Tables and views ==
Information about what tables and views (other than basic ones) are supported natively.

| | Temporary table | Materialized view |
|---|---|---|
| 4th Dimension | Yes | No |
| ADABAS | ? | ? |
| Adaptive Server Enterprise | Yes^{1} | Yes – see precomputed result sets |
| Advantage Database Server | Yes | No (only common views) |
| Altibase | Yes | No (only common views) |
| Apache Derby | Yes | No |
| ClustrixDB | Yes | No |
| CUBRID | Yes (only CTE) | No (only common views) |
| IBM Db2 | Yes | Yes |
| Empress Embedded Database | Yes | Yes |
| EXASolution | Yes | No |
| Firebird | Yes | No (only common views) |
| HSQLDB | Yes | No |
| H2 | Yes | No (only common views) |
| Informix Dynamic Server | Yes | No^{2} |
| Ingres | Yes | No |
| InterBase | Yes | No |
| Linter SQL RDBMS | Yes | Yes |
| LucidDB | No | No |
| MariaDB | Yes | No^{4} |
| MaxDB | Yes | No |
| Microsoft Access (JET) | No | No |
| Microsoft Visual Foxpro | Yes | Yes |
| Microsoft SQL Server | Yes | Yes |
| Microsoft SQL Server Compact (Embedded Database) | Yes | No |
| Mimer SQL | No | No |
| MonetDB | Yes | No (only common views) |
| MySQL | Yes | No^{4} |
| Oracle | Yes | Yes |
| Oracle Rdb | Yes | Yes |
| OpenLink Virtuoso | Yes | Yes |
| Actian Zen (PSQL) | Yes | No |
| Polyhedra DBMS | No | No (only common views) |
| PostgreSQL | Yes | Yes |
| SAP HANA | Yes | ? |
| solidDB | Yes | No (only common views) |
| SQL Anywhere | Yes | Yes |
| SQLite | Yes | No |
| Superbase | Yes | Yes |
| Teradata | Yes | Yes |
| UniData | Yes | No |
| UniVerse | Yes | No |
| | Temporary table | Materialized view |

- Note (1): Server provides tempdb, which can be used for public and private (for the session) temp tables.
- Note (2): Materialized views are not supported in Informix; the term is used in IBM's documentation to refer to a temporary table created to run the view's query when it is too complex, but one cannot for example define the way it is refreshed or build an index on it. The term is defined in the Informix Performance Guide.
- Note (4): Materialized views can be emulated using stored procedures and triggers.

== Indexes ==
Information about what indexes (other than basic B-/B+ tree indexes) are supported natively.

| | R-/R+ tree | Hash | Expression | Partial | Reverse | Bitmap | GiST | GIN | Full-text | Spatial | Forest of Trees Index | Duplicate index prevention |
|---|---|---|---|---|---|---|---|---|---|---|---|---|
| 4th Dimension | ? | Cluster | ? | ? | ? | ? | ? | ? | Yes | ? | ? | No |
| ADABAS | ? | ? | ? | ? | ? | ? | ? | ? | ? | ? | ? | No |
| Adaptive Server Enterprise | No | No | Yes | No | Yes | No | No | No | Yes | ? | ? | No |
| Advantage Database Server | No | No | Yes | No | Yes | Yes | No | No | Yes | ? | ? | No |
| Apache Derby | No | No | No | No | No | No | No | No | No | ? | ? | No |
| ClustrixDB | No | Yes | No | No | No | No | No | No | No | No | ? | No |
| CUBRID | No | No | Yes | Yes | Yes | No | No | No | No | No | No | No |
| IBM Db2 | Yes | Yes | Yes | No | Yes | Yes | No | No | Yes | ? | ? | No |
| Empress Embedded Database | Yes | No | No | Yes | No | Yes | No | No | No | ? | ? | No |
| EXASolution | No | Yes | No | No | No | No | No | No | No | ? | ? | No |
| Firebird | No | No | Yes | Yes | Yes | No | No | No | No | ? | ? | No |
| HSQLDB | No | No | No | No | No | No | No | No | No | ? | ? | No |
| H2 | No | Yes | No | No | No | No | No | No | Yes | Yes | ? | No |
| Informix Dynamic Server | Yes | Yes | Yes | Yes | Yes | Yes | Yes | Yes | Yes | Yes | Yes | Yes |
| Ingres | Yes | Yes | Ingres v10 | No | No | Ingres v10 | No | No | No | ? | ? | No |
| InterBase | No | No | No | No | No | No | No | No | No | ? | ? | No |
| Linter SQL RDBMS^{10} | No | Yes temporary indexes for equality joins | Yes for some scalar functions like LOWER and UPPER | No | No | No | No | No | Yes | No | No | Yes |
| LucidDB | No | No | No | No | No | Yes | No | No | No | ? | ? | No |
| MariaDB | Aria and MyISAM tables and, since v10.2.2, InnoDB tables only | MEMORY, InnoDB,^{5} tables only | PERSISTENT virtual columns only | No | No | No | No | No | Yes | Aria and MyISAM tables and, since v10.2.2, InnoDB tables only | ? | No |
| MaxDB | No | No | No | No | No | No | No | No | No | ? | ? | No |
| Microsoft Access (JET) | No | No | No | No | No | No | No | No | No | ? | ? | No |
| Microsoft Visual Foxpro | No | No | Yes | Yes | Yes^{2} | Yes | No | No | No | ? | ? | No |
| Microsoft SQL Server | Spatial Indexes | Yes^{4} | Yes^{3} | Yes | on Computed columns^{3} | Bitmap filter index for Star Join Query | No | No | Yes | Yes | ? | No |
| Microsoft SQL Server Compact (Embedded Database) | No | No | No | No | No | No | No | No | No | ? | ? | No |
| Mimer SQL | No | No | No | No | Yes | No | No | No | Yes | Yes | No | No |
| MonetDB | No | Yes | No | No | No | No | No | No | No | No | No | No |
| MySQL | Spatial Indexes | MEMORY, Cluster (NDB), InnoDB,^{5} tables only | No | No | No | No | No | No | MyISAM tables and, since v5.6.4, InnoDB tables | MyISAM tables and, since v5.7.5, InnoDB tables | ? | No |
| OpenLink Virtuoso | Yes | Cluster | Yes | Yes | No | Yes | No | No | Yes | Yes (Commercial only) | No | No |
| Oracle | Yes ^{11} | Cluster Tables | Yes | Yes ^{6} | Yes | Yes | No | No | Yes | Yes | ? | Yes |
| Oracle Rdb | No | Yes | ? | No | No | ? | No | No | ? | ? | ? | No |
| Actian Zen (PSQL) | No | No | No | No | No | No | No | No | No | No | No | No |
| Polyhedra DBMS | No | Yes | No | No | No | No | No | No | No | No | ? | No |
| PostgreSQL | Yes | Yes | Yes | Yes | Yes^{7} | Yes | Yes | Yes | Yes | PostGIS | No | No |
| SAP HANA | ? | ? | ? | ? | ? | ? | ? | ? | ? | ? | ? | No |
| solidDB | No | No | No | No | Yes | No | No | No | No | No | No | No |
| SQL Anywhere | No | No | Yes | No | No | No | No | No | Yes | Yes | ? | Yes |
| SQLite | Yes | No | Yes | Yes | No | No | No | No | Yes | SpatiaLite | ? | No |
| SQream DB | ? | ? | ? | ? | Yes | ? | ? | ? | ? | ? | ? | No |
| Teradata | No | Yes | Yes | Yes | No | Yes | No | No | ? | ? | ? | No |
| UniVerse | Yes | Yes | Yes^{3} | Yes^{3} | Yes^{3} | No | No | No | ? | Yes | ? | No |
| | R-/R+ tree | Hash | Expression | Partial | Reverse | Bitmap | GiST | GIN | Full-text | Spatial | Forest of Trees Index | Duplicate index prevention |

- Note (1): The users need to use a function from freeAdhocUDF library or similar.
- Note (2): Can be implemented for most data types using expression-based indexes.
- Note (3): Can be emulated by indexing a computed column (doesn't easily update) or by using an "Indexed View" (proper name not just any view works).
- Note (4): Used for InMemory ColumnStore index, temporary hash index for hash join, Non/Cluster & fill factor.
- Note (5): InnoDB automatically generates adaptive hash index entries as needed.
- Note (6): Can be implemented using Function-based Indexes in Oracle 8i and higher, but the function needs to be used in the sql for the index to be used.
- Note (7): A PostgreSQL functional index can be used to reverse the order of a field.
- Note (10): B+ tree and full-text only for now.
- Note (11): R-Tree indexing available in base edition with Locator but some functionality requires Personal Edition or Enterprise Edition with Spatial option.
- Note (12): FOT or Forest of Trees indexes is a type of B-tree index consisting of multiple B-trees which reduces contention in multi-user environments.

== Database capabilities ==
| | Union | Intersect | Except | Inner joins | Outer joins | Inner selects | Merge joins | Blobs and clobs | Common table expressions | Windowing functions | Parallel query | System-versioned tables |
|---|---|---|---|---|---|---|---|---|---|---|---|---|
| 4th Dimension | Yes | Yes | Yes | Yes | Yes | No | No | Yes | ? | ? | ? | ? |
| ADABAS | Yes | ? | ? | ? | ? | ? | ? | ? | ? | ? | ? | ? |
| Adaptive Server Enterprise | Yes | ? | ? | Yes | Yes | Yes | Yes | Yes | ? | ? | Yes | ? |
| Advantage Database Server | Yes | No | No | Yes | Yes | Yes | Yes | Yes | ? | No | ? | ? |
| Altibase | Yes | Yes | Yes, via MINUS | Yes | Yes | Yes | Yes | Yes | No | No | No | ? |
| Apache Derby | Yes | Yes | Yes | Yes | Yes | Yes | ? | Yes | No | No | ? | ? |
| ClustrixDB | Yes | No | No | Yes | Yes | Yes | No | Yes | Yes | Yes | Yes | ? |
| CUBRID | Yes | Yes | Yes | Yes | Yes | Yes | Yes | Yes | Yes | Yes | ? | ? |
| IBM Db2 | Yes | Yes | Yes | Yes | Yes | Yes | Yes | Yes | Yes | Yes | Yes | Yes |
| Empress Embedded Database | Yes | Yes | Yes | Yes | Yes | Yes | Yes | Yes | ? | ? | ? | ? |
| EXASolution | Yes | Yes | Yes | Yes | Yes | Yes | Yes | No | Yes | Yes | Yes | ? |
| Firebird | Yes | No | No | Yes | Yes | Yes | Yes | Yes | Yes | Yes | ? | ? |
| HSQLDB | Yes | Yes | Yes | Yes | Yes | Yes | Yes | Yes | Yes | No | Yes | ? |
| H2 | Yes | Yes | Yes | Yes | Yes | Yes | No | Yes | experimental | Yes | ? | ? |
| Informix Dynamic Server | Yes | Yes | Yes, via MINUS | Yes | Yes | Yes | Yes | Yes | Yes | Yes | Yes | ? |
| Ingres | Yes | No | No | Yes | Yes | Yes | Yes | Yes | Yes | Yes | Yes | ? |
| InterBase | Yes | ? | ? | Yes | Yes | ? | ? | Yes | ? | ? | ? | ? |
| Linter SQL RDBMS | Yes | Yes | Yes | Yes | Yes | Yes | Yes | Yes | Yes | Yes | No | No |
| LucidDB | Yes | Yes | Yes | Yes | Yes | Yes | Yes | No | ? | ? | ? | ? |
| MariaDB | Yes | 10.3+ | 10.3+ | Yes | Yes | Yes | No | Yes | Yes | Yes | No | Yes |
| MaxDB | Yes | ? | ? | Yes | Yes | Yes | No | Yes | ? | ? | ? | ? |
| Microsoft Access (JET) | Yes | No | No | Yes | Yes | Yes | No | Yes | No | No | ? | ? |
| Microsoft Visual Foxpro | Yes | ? | ? | Yes | Yes | Yes | ? | Yes | ? | ? | ? | ? |
| Microsoft SQL Server | Yes | Yes | Yes | Yes | Yes | Yes | Yes | Yes | Yes | Yes | Yes | Yes |
| Microsoft SQL Server Compact (Embedded Database) | Yes | No | No | Yes | Yes | ? | No | Yes | No | No | ? | ? |
| Mimer SQL | Yes | Yes | Yes | Yes | Yes | Yes | ? | Yes | Yes | No | No | ? |
| MonetDB | Yes | Yes | Yes | Yes | Yes | Yes | Yes | Yes | Yes | Yes | Yes | No |
| MySQL | Yes | 8+ | 8+ | Yes | Yes | Yes | No | Yes | 8+ | 8+ | No | No |
| OpenLink Virtuoso | Yes | Yes | Yes | Yes | Yes | Yes | ? | Yes | ? | ? | Yes | ? |
| Oracle | Yes | Yes | Yes, via MINUS | Yes | Yes | Yes | Yes | Yes | Yes ^{1} | Yes | Yes | Yes |
| Oracle Rdb | Yes | Yes | Yes | Yes | Yes | Yes | Yes | Yes | ? | ? | ? | ? |
| Actian Zen (PSQL) | Yes | No | No | Yes | Yes | ? | ? | Yes | No | No | No | ? |
| Polyhedra DBMS | Yes | Yes | Yes | Yes | Yes | No | No | Yes | No | No | No | ? |
| PostgreSQL | Yes | Yes | Yes | Yes | Yes | Yes | Yes | Yes | Yes | Yes | Yes | No |
| SAP HANA | ? | ? | ? | ? | ? | ? | ? | ? | ? | ? | ? | ? |
| solidDB | Yes | Yes | Yes | Yes | Yes | Yes | Yes | Yes | Yes | No | No | ? |
| SQL Anywhere | Yes | Yes | Yes | Yes | Yes | Yes | Yes | Yes | Yes | Yes | Yes | ? |
| SQLite | Yes | Yes | Yes | Yes | 3.43.0+ | Yes | No | Yes | 3.8.3+ | 3.25+ | No | No |
| SQream DB | ALL only | No | No | Yes | Yes | Yes | Yes | No | Yes | Yes | No | ? |
| Teradata | Yes | Yes | Yes | Yes | Yes | Yes | Yes | Yes | Yes | Yes | Yes | ? |
| UniVerse | Yes | Yes | Yes | Yes | Yes | Yes | Yes | No | No | No | ? | ? |
| | Union | Intersect | Except | Inner joins | Outer joins | Inner selects | Merge joins | Blobs and clobs | Common table expressions | Windowing functions | Parallel query | System-versioned tables |

- Note (1): Recursive CTEs introduced in 11gR2 supersedes similar construct called CONNECT BY.

== Data types ==
| | Type system | Integer | Floating point | Decimal | String | Binary | Date/Time | Boolean | Other |
|---|---|---|---|---|---|---|---|---|---|
| 4th Dimension | Static | UUID (16-bit), SMALLINT (16-bit), INT (32-bit), BIGINT (64-bit), NUMERIC (64-bit) | REAL, FLOAT | REAL, FLOAT | CLOB, TEXT, VARCHAR | BIT, BIT VARYING, BLOB | DURATION, INTERVAL, TIMESTAMP | BOOLEAN | PICTURE |
| Altibase | Static | SMALLINT (16-bit), INTEGER (32-bit), BIGINT (64-bit) | REAL (32-bit), DOUBLE (64-bit) | DECIMAL, NUMERIC, NUMBER, FLOAT | CHAR, VARCHAR, NCHAR, NVARCHAR, CLOB | BLOB, BYTE, NIBBLE, BIT, VARBIT | DATE | | GEOMETRY |
| ClustrixDB | Static | TINYINT (8-bit), SMALLINT (16-bit), MEDIUMINT (24-bit), INT (32-bit), BIGINT (64-bit) | FLOAT (32-bit), DOUBLE | DECIMAL | CHAR, BINARY, VARCHAR, VARBINARY, TEXT, TINYTEXT, MEDIUMTEXT, LONGTEXT | TINYBLOB, BLOB, MEDIUMBLOB, LONGBLOB | DATETIME, DATE, TIMESTAMP, YEAR | BIT(1), BOOLEAN | ENUM, SET, |
| CUBRID | Static | SMALLINT (16-bit), INTEGER (32-bit), BIGINT (64-bit) | FLOAT, REAL(32-bit), DOUBLE(64-bit) | DECIMAL, NUMERIC | CHAR, VARCHAR, NCHAR, NVARCHAR, CLOB | BLOB | DATE, DATETIME, TIME, TIMESTAMP | BIT | MONETARY, BIT VARYING, SET, MULTISET, SEQUENCE, ENUM |
| IBM Db2 | ? | SMALLINT (16-bit), INTEGER (32-bit), BIGINT (64-bit) | DECFLOAT, REAL, DOUBLE | DECIMAL | CLOB, CHAR, VARCHAR | BINARY, VARBINARY, BLOB | DATE, TIME, TIMESTAMP WITH TIME ZONE, TIMESTAMP WITHOUT TIME ZONE | BOOLEAN | XML, GRAPHIC, VARGRAPHIC, DBCLOB, ROWID |
| Empress Embedded Database | Static | TINYINT, SQL_TINYINT, or INTEGER8; SMALLINT, SQL_SMALLINT, or INTEGER16; INTEGER, INT, SQL_INTEGER, or INTEGER32; BIGINT, SQL_BIGINT, or INTEGER64 | REAL, SQL_REAL, or FLOAT32; DOUBLE PRECISION, SQL_DOUBLE, or FLOAT64; FLOAT, or SQL_FLOAT; EFLOAT | DECIMAL, DEC, NUMERIC, SQL_DECIMAL, or SQL_NUMERIC; DOLLAR | CHARACTER, ECHARACTER, CHARACTER VARYING, NATIONAL CHARACTER, NATIONAL CHARACTER VARYING, NLSCHARACTER, CHARACTER LARGE OBJECT, TEXT, NATIONAL CHARACTER LARGE OBJECT, NLSTEXT | BINARY LARGE OBJECT or BLOB; BULK | DATE, EDATE, TIME, ETIME, EPOCH_TIME, TIMESTAMP, MICROTIMESTAMP | BOOLEAN | SEQUENCE 32, SEQUENCE |
| EXASolution | Static | TINYINT, SMALLINT, INTEGER, BIGINT, | REAL, FLOAT, DOUBLE | DECIMAL, DEC, NUMERIC, NUMBER | CHAR, NCHAR, VARCHAR, VARCHAR2, NVARCHAR, NVARCHAR2, CLOB, NCLOB | N/A | DATE, TIMESTAMP, INTERVAL | BOOLEAN, BOOL | GEOMETRY |
| FileMaker | Static | Not Supported | Not Supported | NUMBER | TEXT | CONTAINER | TIMESTAMP | Not Supported | |
| Firebird | ? | INT128, INT64, INTEGER, SMALLINT | DOUBLE, FLOAT | DECIMAL, NUMERIC, DECIMAL(38, 4), DECIMAL(10, 4) | BLOB, CHAR, CHAR(x) CHARACTER SET UNICODE_FSS, VARCHAR(x) CHARACTER SET UNICODE_FSS, VARCHAR | BLOB SUB_TYPE TEXT, BLOB | DATE, TIME, TIMESTAMP (without time zone and with time zone) | BOOLEAN | TIMESTAMP, TIMESTAMP WITH TIME ZONE, CHAR(38), User defined types (Domains) |
| | Type system | Integer | Floating point | Decimal | String | Binary | Date/Time | Boolean | Other |
| HSQLDB | Static | TINYINT (8-bit), SMALLINT (16-bit), INTEGER (32-bit), BIGINT (64-bit) | DOUBLE (64-bit) | DECIMAL, NUMERIC | CHAR, VARCHAR, LONGVARCHAR, CLOB | BINARY, VARBINARY, LONGVARBINARY, BLOB | DATE, TIME, TIMESTAMP, INTERVAL | BOOLEAN | OTHER (object), BIT, BIT VARYING, ARRAY |
| Informix Dynamic Server | Static + UDT | SMALLINT (16-bit), INT (32-bit), INT8 (64-bit proprietary), BIGINT (64-bit) | SMALLFLOAT (32-bit), FLOAT (64-bit) | DECIMAL (32 decimal digits float/fixed, range 10^{130} to +10^{125}), MONEY | CHAR, VARCHAR, NCHAR, NVARCHAR, LVARCHAR, CLOB, TEXT, LONGLVARCHAR | TEXT, BYTE, BLOB, CLOB | DATE, DATETIME, INTERVAL | BOOLEAN | SET, LIST, MULTISET, ROW, TIMESERIES, SPATIAL, GEODETIC, NODE, JSON, BSON, USER DEFINED TYPES |
| Ingres | Static | TINYINT (8-bit), SMALLINT (16-bit), INTEGER (32-bit), BIGINT (64-bit) | FLOAT4 (32-bit), FLOAT (64-bit) | DECIMAL | C, CHAR, VARCHAR, LONG VARCHAR, NCHAR, NVARCHAR, LONG NVARCHAR, TEXT | BYTE, VARBYTE, LONG VARBYTE (BLOB) | DATE, ANSIDATE, INGRESDATE, TIME, TIMESTAMP, INTERVAL | N/A | MONEY, OBJECT_KEY, TABLE_KEY, USER-DEFINED DATA TYPES (via OME) |
| Linter SQL RDBMS | Static + Dynamic (in stored procedures) | SMALLINT (16-bit), INTEGER (32-bit), BIGINT (64-bit) | REAL(32-bit), DOUBLE(64-bit) | DECIMAL, NUMERIC | CHAR, VARCHAR, NCHAR, NVARCHAR, BLOB | BYTE, VARBYTE, BLOB | DATE | BOOLEAN | GEOMETRY, EXTFILE |
| MariaDB | Static | TINYINT (8-bit), SMALLINT (16-bit), MEDIUMINT (24-bit), INT (32-bit), BIGINT (64-bit) | FLOAT (32-bit), DOUBLE (aka REAL) (64-bit) | DECIMAL | CHAR, BINARY, VARCHAR, VARBINARY, TEXT, TINYTEXT, MEDIUMTEXT, LONGTEXT | TINYBLOB, BLOB, MEDIUMBLOB, LONGBLOB | DATETIME, DATE, TIMESTAMP, YEAR | BIT(1), BOOLEAN (aka BOOL) = synonym for TINYINT | ENUM, SET, GIS data types (Geometry, Point, Curve, LineString, Surface, Polygon, GeometryCollection, MultiPoint, MultiCurve, MultiLineString, MultiSurface, MultiPolygon) |
| Microsoft SQL Server | Static | TINYINT, SMALLINT, INT, BIGINT | FLOAT, REAL | NUMERIC, DECIMAL, SMALLMONEY, MONEY | CHAR, VARCHAR, TEXT, NCHAR, NVARCHAR, NTEXT | BINARY, VARBINARY, IMAGE, FILESTREAM, FILETABLE | DATE, DATETIMEOFFSET, DATETIME2, SMALLDATETIME, DATETIME, TIME | BIT | CURSOR, TIMESTAMP, HIERARCHYID, UNIQUEIDENTIFIER, SQL_VARIANT, XML, TABLE, Geometry, Geography, Custom .NET datatypes |
| Microsoft SQL Server Compact (Embedded Database) | Static | TINYINT, SMALLINT, INT, BIGINT | FLOAT, REAL | NUMERIC, DECIMAL, MONEY | NCHAR, NVARCHAR, NTEXT | BINARY, VARBINARY, IMAGE | DATETIME | BIT | TIMESTAMP, ROWVERSION, UNIQUEIDENTIFIER, IDENTITY, ROWGUIDCOL |
| Mimer SQL | Static | SMALLINT, INT, BIGINT, INTEGER(n) | FLOAT, REAL, DOUBLE, FLOAT(n) | NUMERIC, DECIMAL | CHAR, VARCHAR, NCHAR, NVARCHAR, CLOB, NCLOB | BINARY, VARBINARY, BLOB | DATE, TIME, TIMESTAMP, INTERVAL | BOOLEAN | DOMAINS, USER-DEFINED TYPES (including the pre-defined spatial data types location, latitude, longitude and coordinate, and UUID) |
| MonetDB | Static, extensible | TINYINT, SMALLINT, INT, INTEGER, BIGINT, HUGEINT, SERIAL, BIGSERIAL | FLOAT, FLOAT(n), REAL, DOUBLE, DOUBLE PRECISION | DECIMAL, NUMERIC | CHAR, CHAR(n), VARCHAR, VARCHAR(n), CLOB, CLOB(n), TEXT, STRING | BLOB, BLOB(n) | DATE, TIME, TIME WITH TIME ZONE, TIMESTAMP, TIMESTAMP WITH TIME ZONE, INTERVAL YEAR, INTERVAL MONTH, INTERVAL DAY, INTERVAL HOUR, INTERVAL MINUTE, INTERVAL SECOND | BOOLEAN | JSON, JSON(n), URL, URL(n), INET, UUID, GIS data types (Geometry, Point, Curve, LineString, Surface, Polygon, GeometryCollection, MultiPoint, MultiCurve, MultiLineString, MultiSurface, MultiPolygon), User Defined Types |
| MySQL | Static | TINYINT (8-bit), SMALLINT (16-bit), MEDIUMINT (24-bit), INT (32-bit), BIGINT (64-bit) | FLOAT (32-bit), DOUBLE (aka REAL) (64-bit) | DECIMAL | CHAR, BINARY, VARCHAR, VARBINARY, TEXT, TINYTEXT, MEDIUMTEXT, LONGTEXT | TINYBLOB, BLOB, MEDIUMBLOB, LONGBLOB | DATETIME, DATE, TIMESTAMP, YEAR | BIT(1), BOOLEAN (aka BOOL) = synonym for TINYINT | ENUM, SET, GIS data types (Geometry, Point, Curve, LineString, Surface, Polygon, GeometryCollection, MultiPoint, MultiCurve, MultiLineString, MultiSurface, MultiPolygon) |
| OpenLink Virtuoso | Static + Dynamic | INT, INTEGER, SMALLINT | REAL, DOUBLE PRECISION, FLOAT, FLOAT(n) | DECIMAL, DECIMAL(n), DECIMAL(m, n), NUMERIC, NUMERIC(n), NUMERIC(m, n) | CHARACTER, CHAR(n), VARCHAR, VARCHAR(n), NVARCHAR, NVARCHAR(n) | BLOB | TIMESTAMP, DATETIME, TIME, DATE | N/A | ANY, REFERENCE (IRI, URI), UDT (User Defined Type), GEOMETRY (BOX, BOX2D, BOX3D, BOXM, BOXZ, BOXZM, CIRCULARSTRING, COMPOUNDCURVE, CURVEPOLYGON, EMPTY, GEOMETRYCOLLECTION, GEOMETRYCOLLECTIONM, GEOMETRYCOLLECTIONZ, GEOMETRYCOLLECTIONZM, LINESTRING, LINESTRINGM, LINESTRINGZ, LINESTRINGZM, MULTICURVE, MULTILINESTRING, MULTILINESTRINGM, MULTILINESTRINGZ, MULTILINESTRINGZM, MULTIPOINT, MULTIPOINTM, MULTIPOINTZ, MULTIPOINTZM, MULTIPOLYGON, MULTIPOLYGONM, MULTIPOLYGONZ, MULTIPOLYGONZM, POINT, POINTM, POINTZ, POINTZM, POLYGON, POLYGONM, POLYGONZ, POLYGONZM, POLYLINE, POLYLINEZ, RING, RINGM, RINGZ, RINGZM) |
| | Type system | Integer | Floating point | Decimal | String | Binary | Date/Time | Boolean | Other |
| Oracle | Static + Dynamic (through ANYDATA) | NUMBER | BINARY_FLOAT, BINARY_DOUBLE | NUMBER | CHAR, VARCHAR2, CLOB, NCLOB, NVARCHAR2, NCHAR, LONG (deprecated) | BLOB, RAW, LONG RAW (deprecated), BFILE | DATE, TIMESTAMP (with/without TIME ZONE), INTERVAL | N/A | SPATIAL, IMAGE, AUDIO, VIDEO, DICOM, XMLType, UDT, JSON |
| Actian Zen (PSQL) | Static | BIGINT, INTEGER, SMALLINT, TINYINT, UBIGINT, UINTEGER, USMALLINT, UTINYINT | BFLOAT4, BFLOAT8, DOUBLE, FLOAT | DECIMAL, NUMERIC, NUMERICSA, NUMERICSLB, NUMERICSLS, NUMERICSTB, NUMERICSTS | CHAR, LONGVARCHAR, VARCHAR | BINARY, LONGVARBINARY, VARBINARY | DATE, DATETIME, TIME | BIT | CURRENCY, IDENTITY, SMALLIDENTITY, TIMESTAMP, UNIQUEIDENTIFIER |
| Polyhedra | Static | INTEGER8 (8-bit), INTEGER(16-bit), INTEGER (32-bit), INTEGER64 (64-bit) | FLOAT32 (32-bit), FLOAT (aka REAL; 64-bit) | N/A | VARCHAR, LARGE VARCHAR (aka CHARACTER LARGE OBJECT) | LARGE BINARY (aka BINARY LARGE OBJECT) | DATETIME | BOOLEAN | N/A |
| PostgreSQL | Static | SMALLINT (16-bit), INTEGER (32-bit), BIGINT (64-bit) | REAL (32-bit), DOUBLE PRECISION (64-bit) | DECIMAL, NUMERIC | CHAR, VARCHAR, TEXT | BYTEA | DATE, TIME (with/without TIME ZONE), TIMESTAMP (with/without TIME ZONE), INTERVAL | BOOLEAN | ENUM, POINT, LINE, LSEG, BOX, PATH, POLYGON, CIRCLE, CIDR, INET, MACADDR, BIT, UUID, XML, JSON, JSONB, arrays, composites, ranges, custom |
| SAP HANA | Static | TINYINT, SMALLINT, INTEGER, BIGINT | SMALLDECIMAL, REAL, DOUBLE, FLOAT, FLOAT(n) | DECIMAL | VARCHAR, NVARCHAR, ALPHANUM, SHORTTEXT | VARBINARY, BINTEXT, BLOB | DATE, TIME, SECONDDATE, TIMESTAMP | BOOLEAN | CLOB, NCLOB, TEXT, ARRAY, ST_GEOMETRY, ST_POINT, ST_MULTIPOINT, ST_LINESTRING, ST_MULTILINESTRING, ST_POLYGON, ST_MULTIPOLYGON, ST_GEOMETRYCOLLECTION, ST_CIRCULARSTRING |
| solidDB | Static | TINYINT (8-bit), SMALLINT (16-bit), INTEGER (32-bit), BIGINT (64-bit) | REAL (32-bit), DOUBLE (64-bit), FLOAT (64-bit) | DECIMAL, NUMERIC (51 digits) | CHAR, VARCHAR, LONG VARCHAR, WCHAR, WVARCHAR, LONG WVARCHAR | BINARY, VARBINARY, LONG VARBINARY | DATE, TIME, TIMESTAMP | | |
| SQLite | Dynamic | INTEGER (64-bit) | REAL (aka FLOAT, DOUBLE) (64-bit) | N/A | TEXT (aka CHAR, CLOB) | BLOB | N/A | N/A | N/A |
| SQream DB | Static | TINYINT (8-bit), SMALLINT (16-bit), INTEGER (32-bit), BIGINT (64-bit) | REAL (32-bit), DOUBLE (aka FLOAT) (64-bit) | N/A | CHAR, VARCHAR, NVARCHAR | N/A | DATE, DATETIME (aka TIMESTAMP) | BOOL | N/A |
| | Type system | Integer | Floating point | Decimal | String | Binary | Date/Time | Boolean | Other |
| Teradata | Static | BYTEINT (8-bit), SMALLINT (16-bit), INTEGER (32-bit), BIGINT (64-bit) | FLOAT (64-bit) | DECIMAL, NUMERIC (38 digits) | CHAR, VARCHAR, CLOB | BYTE, VARBYTE, BLOB | DATE, TIME, TIMESTAMP (w/wo TIME ZONE) | | PERIOD, INTERVAL, GEOMETRY, XML, JSON, UDT (User Defined Type) |
| UniData | Dynamic | N/A | N/A | N/A | N/A | N/A | N/A | N/A | N/A |
| UniVerse | Dynamic | N/A | N/A | N/A | N/A | N/A | N/A | N/A | N/A |
| | Type system | Integer | Floating point | Decimal | String | Binary | Date/Time | Boolean | Other |

== Other objects ==
Information about what other objects are supported natively.

| | Data domain | Cursor | Trigger | Function^{1} | Procedure^{1} | External routine^{1} |
|---|---|---|---|---|---|---|
| 4th Dimension | Yes | No | Yes | Yes | Yes | Yes |
| ADABAS | ? | Yes | ? | Yes? | Yes? | Yes |
| Adaptive Server Enterprise | Yes | Yes | Yes | Yes | Yes | Yes |
| Advantage Database Server | Yes | Yes | Yes | Yes | Yes | Yes |
| Altibase | Yes | Yes | Yes | Yes | Yes | Yes |
| Apache Derby | No | Yes | Yes | Yes^{2} | Yes^{2} | Yes^{2} |
| ClustrixDB | No | Yes | No | Yes | Yes | Yes |
| CUBRID | Yes | Yes | Yes | Yes | Yes^{2} | Yes |
| Empress Embedded Database | Yes via RANGE CHECK | Yes | Yes | Yes | Yes | Yes |
| EXASolution | Yes | No | No | Yes | Yes | Yes |
| IBM Db2 | Yes via CHECK CONSTRAINT | Yes | Yes | Yes | Yes | Yes |
| Firebird | Yes | Yes | Yes | Yes | Yes | Yes |
| HSQLDB | Yes | No | Yes | Yes | Yes | Yes |
| H2 | Yes | No | Yes^{2} | Yes^{2} | Yes^{2} | Yes |
| Informix Dynamic Server | Yes via CHECK | Yes | Yes | Yes | Yes | Yes ^{5} |
| Ingres | Yes | Yes | Yes | Yes | Yes | Yes |
| InterBase | Yes | Yes | Yes | Yes | Yes | Yes |
| Linter SQL RDBMS | No | Yes | Yes | Yes | Yes | No |
| LucidDB | No | Yes | No | Yes^{2} | Yes^{2} | Yes^{2} |
| MariaDB | Yes | Yes | Yes | Yes | Yes | Yes |
| MaxDB | Yes | Yes | Yes | Yes | Yes | ? |
| Microsoft Access (JET) | Yes | No | No | No | Yes, But single DML/DDL Operation | Yes |
| Microsoft Visual Foxpro | No | Yes | Yes | Yes | Yes | Yes |
| Microsoft SQL Server | Yes | Yes | Yes | Yes | Yes | Yes |
| Microsoft SQL Server Compact (Embedded Database) | No | Yes | No | No | No | No |
| Mimer SQL | Yes | Yes | Yes | Yes | Yes | No |
| MonetDB | No | No | Yes | Yes | Yes | Yes |
| MySQL | No ^{3} | Yes | Yes | Yes | Yes | Yes |
| Oracle | Yes | Yes | Yes | Yes | Yes | Yes |
| Oracle Rdb | Yes | Yes | Yes | Yes | Yes | Yes |
| OpenLink Virtuoso | Yes | Yes | Yes | Yes | Yes | Yes |
| Actian Zen (PSQL) | Yes | Yes | Yes | Yes | Yes | No |
| Polyhedra DBMS | No | No | Yes | Yes | Yes | Yes |
| PostgreSQL | Yes | Yes | Yes | Yes | Yes | Yes |
| SAP HANA | ? | ? | ? | ? | ? | ? |
| solidDB | Yes | Yes | Yes | Yes | Yes | Yes |
| SQL Anywhere | Yes | Yes | Yes | Yes | Yes | Yes |
| SQLite | No | No | Yes | No | No | Yes |
| Teradata | No | Yes | Yes | Yes | Yes | Yes |
| UniData | No | No | Yes | Yes | Yes | Yes |
| UniVerse | No | No | Yes | Yes | Yes | Yes |
| | Data domain | Cursor | Trigger | Function^{1} | Procedure^{1} | External routine^{1} |

- Note (1): Both function and procedure refer to internal routines written in SQL and/or procedural language like PL/SQL. External routine refers to the one written in the host languages, such as C, Java, Cobol, etc. "Stored procedure" is a commonly used term for these routine types. However, its definition varies between different database vendors.
- Note (2): In Derby, H2, LucidDB, and CUBRID, users code functions and procedures in Java.
- Note (3): ENUM datatype exists. CHECK clause enforced as of 8.0.16.
- Note (5): Informix supports external functions written in Java, C, & C++.

== Partitioning ==
Information about what partitioning methods are supported natively.

| | Range | Hash | Composite (Range+Hash) | List | Expression | Round Robin |
|---|---|---|---|---|---|---|
| 4th Dimension | ? | ? | ? | ? | ? | ? |
| ADABAS | ? | ? | ? | ? | ? | ? |
| Adaptive Server Enterprise | Yes | Yes | No | Yes | ? | ? |
| Advantage Database Server | No | No | No | No | ? | ? |
| Altibase | Yes | Yes | No | Yes | ? | ? |
| Apache Derby | No | No | No | No | ? | ? |
| ClustrixDB | Yes | No | No | No | No | ? |
| CUBRID | Yes | Yes | No | Yes | ? | ? |
| IBM Db2 | Yes | Yes | Yes | Yes | Yes | ? |
| Empress Embedded Database | No | No | No | No | ? | ? |
| EXASolution | No | Yes | No | No | No | ? |
| Firebird | No | No | No | No | ? | ? |
| HSQLDB | No | No | No | No | ? | ? |
| H2 | No | No | No | No | ? | ? |
| Informix Dynamic Server | Yes | Yes | Yes | Yes | Yes | Yes |
| Ingres | Yes | Yes | Yes | Yes | ? | ? |
| InterBase | No | No | No | No | ? | ? |
| Linter SQL RDBMS | No | No | No | No | No | ? |
| MariaDB | Yes | Yes | Yes | Yes | ? | ? |
| MaxDB | No | No | No | No | ? | ? |
| Microsoft Access (JET) | No | No | No | No | ? | ? |
| Microsoft Visual Foxpro | No | No | No | No | ? | ? |
| Microsoft SQL Server | Yes | via computed column | via computed column | Yes | via computed column | ? |
| Microsoft SQL Server Compact (Embedded Database) | No | No | No | No | ? | ? |
| Mimer SQL | No | No | No | No | No | ? |
| MonetDB | Yes | No | No | No | Yes | ? |
| MySQL | Yes | Yes | Yes | Yes | ? | ? |
| Oracle | Yes | Yes | Yes | Yes | via Virtual Columns | ? |
| Oracle Rdb | Yes | Yes | ? | ? | ? | ? |
| OpenLink Virtuoso | Yes | Yes | Yes | Yes | Yes | ? |
| Actian Zen (PSQL) | No | No | No | No | No | ? |
| Polyhedra DBMS | No | No | No | No | No | ? |
| PostgreSQL | Yes | Yes | Yes | Yes | Yes | ? |
| SAP HANA | Yes | Yes | Yes | Yes | Yes | ? |
| solidDB | Yes | No | No | No | ? | ? |
| SQL Anywhere | No | No | No | No | ? | ? |
| SQLite | No | No | No | No | ? | ? |
| Teradata | Yes | Yes | Yes | Yes | ? | ? |
| UniVerse | Yes | Yes | Yes | Yes | ? | ? |
| | Range | Hash | Composite (Range+Hash) | List | Expression | Round Robin |

== Access control ==
Information about access control functionalities.

| | Native network encryption^{1} | Brute-force protection | Enterprise directory compatibility | Password complexity rules^{2} | Patch access^{3} | Run unprivileged^{4} | Audit | Resource limit | Separation of duties (RBAC)^{5} | Security Certification | Attribute-based access control (ABAC) |
|---|---|---|---|---|---|---|---|---|---|---|---|
| 4D | Yes (with SSL) | ? | Yes | ? | Yes | Yes | ? | ? | ? | ? | ? |
| Adaptive Server Enterprise | Yes (optional; to pay) | Yes | Yes (optional ?) | Yes | Partial (need to register; depend on which product) | Yes | Yes | Yes | Yes | Yes (EAL4+ ^{1}) | ? |
| Advantage Database Server | Yes | No | No | No | Yes | Yes | No | No | Yes | ? | ? |
| CUBRID | Yes (with SSL) | ? | No | No | Yes | Yes | Yes | Yes | Yes | ? | ? |
| IBM Db2 | Yes | ? | Yes (LDAP, Kerberos...) | Yes | ? | Yes | Yes | Yes | Yes | Yes (EAL4+^{6}) | ? |
| Empress Embedded Database | ? | ? | No | No | Yes | Yes | Yes | No | Yes | No | ? |
| EXASolution | No | Yes | Yes (LDAP) | Yes | Yes | Yes | Yes | Yes | Yes | No | ? |
| Firebird | Yes | Yes | Yes (Windows trusted authenification) | Yes (by custom plugin) | Yes (no security page) | Yes | Yes | Yes | No^{7} | ? | ? |
| HSQLDB | Yes | No | Yes | Yes | Yes | Yes | No | No | Yes | No | ? |
| H2 | Yes | Yes | ? | No | ? | Yes | ? | Yes | Yes | No | ? |
| Informix Dynamic Server | Yes | ? | Yes^{10} | ?^{10} | Yes | Yes | Yes | Yes | Yes | ? | Yes |
| Linter SQL RDBMS | Yes (with SSL) | Yes | Yes | Yes (length only) | Yes | Yes | Yes | Yes | Yes | Yes | Yes |
| MariaDB | Yes (SSL) | No | Yes (with 5.2, but not on Windows servers) | Yes | Yes | Yes | ? | ? | ?^{8} | No | ? |
| Microsoft SQL Server | Yes | ? | Yes (Microsoft Active Directory) | Yes | Yes | Yes | Yes (From 2008) | Yes | Yes | Yes (EAL4+^{11}) | ? |
| Microsoft SQL Server Compact (Embedded Database) | No (not relevant, only file permissions) | No (not relevant) | No (not relevant) | No (not relevant) | Yes | Yes (file access) | Yes | Yes | No | ? | ? |
| Mimer SQL | Yes | ? | ? | ? | Yes | Yes (depending on OS) | Yes | ? | Yes | ? | Yes |
| MySQL | Yes (SSL with 4.0) | No | Yes (with 5.5, but only in commercial edition) | No | Partial (no security page) | Yes | ? | ? | ?^{8} | Yes | ? |
| OpenLink Virtuoso | Yes | Yes | Yes | Yes (optional) | Yes (optional) | Yes | Yes (optional) | Yes (optional) | Yes | No | Yes (optional) |
| Oracle | Yes | Yes | Yes | Yes | ? | Yes | Yes | Yes | Yes | Yes (EAL2^{1}) | ? |
| Actian Zen (PSQL) | Yes | ? | No | No | Yes | Yes | Yes ^{12} | No | No | No | ? |
| Polyhedra DBMS | Yes (with SSL. Optional) | No | No | No | No | Yes | Yes ^{13} | Yes | Yes ^{13} | No | ? |
| PostgreSQL | Yes | Yes | Yes (LDAP, Kerberos...^{9}) | Yes (with passwordcheck module) | Yes | Yes | Yes (with pgaudit extension) | Yes | Yes | Yes (EAL2+^{1}) | ? |
| SAP HANA | ? | ? | ? | ? | ? | ? | ? | ? | ? | ? | ? |
| solidDB | No | No | Yes | No | No | Yes | Yes | No | No | No | No |
| SQL Anywhere | Yes | ? | Yes (Kerberos) | Yes | ? | Yes | Yes | No | Yes | Yes (EAL2+^{1} as Adaptive Server Anywhere) | ? |
| SQLite | No (not relevant, only file permissions) | No (not relevant) | No (not relevant) | No (not relevant) | Partial (no security page) | Yes (file access) | Yes | Yes | No | No | ? |
| Teradata | Yes | No | Yes (LDAP, Kerberos...) | Yes | ? | Yes | Yes | Yes | Yes | Yes | Yes |
| | Native network encryption^{1} | Brute-force protection | Enterprise directory compatibility | Password complexity rules^{2} | Patch access^{3} | Run unprivileged^{4} | Audit | Resource limit | Separation of duties (RBAC)^{5} | Security Certification | Attribute-based access control (ABAC) |

- Note (1): Network traffic could be transmitted in a secure way (not clear-text, in general SSL encryption). Precise if option is default, included option or an extra modules to buy.
- Note (2): Options are present to set a minimum size for password, respect complexity like presence of numbers or special characters.
- Note (3): How do you get security updates? Is it free access, do you need a login or to pay? Is there easy access through a Web/FTP portal or RSS feed or only through offline access (mail CD-ROM, phone).
- Note (4): Does database process run as root/administrator or unprivileged user? What is default configuration?
- Note (5): Is there a separate user to manage special operation like backup (only dump/restore permissions), security officer (audit), administrator (add user/create database), etc.? Is it default or optional?
- Note (6): Common Criteria certified product list.
- Note (7): FirebirdSQL seems to only have SYSDBA user and DB owner. There are no separate roles for backup operator and security administrator.
- Note (8): User can define a dedicated backup user but nothing particular in default install.
- Note (9): Authentication methods.
- Note (10): Informix Dynamic Server supports PAM and other configurable authentication. By default uses OS authentication.
- Note (11): Authentication methods.
- Note (12): With the use of Pervasive AuditMaster.
- Note (13): User-based security is optional in Polyhedra, but when enabled can be enhanced to a role-based model with auditing.

== Databases vs schemas (terminology) ==
The SQL specification defines what an "SQL schema" is; however, databases implement it differently. To compound this confusion the functionality can overlap with that of a parent database. An SQL schema is simply a namespace within a database; things within this namespace are addressed using the member operator dot ".". This seems to be a universal among all of the implementations.

A true fully (database, schema, and table) qualified query is exemplified as such: SELECT * FROM database.schema.table

Both a schema and a database can be used to isolate one table, "foo", from another like-named table "foo". The following is pseudo code:

- SELECT * FROM database1.foo vs. SELECT * FROM database2.foo (no explicit schema between database and table)
- SELECT * FROM [database1.]default.foo vs. SELECT * FROM [database1.]alternate.foo (no explicit database prefix)

The problem that arises is that former MySQL users will create multiple databases for one project. In this context, MySQL databases are analogous in function to PostgreSQL-schemas, insomuch as PostgreSQL deliberately lacks off-the-shelf cross-database functionality (preferring multi-tenancy) that MySQL has. Conversely, PostgreSQL has applied more of the specification implementing cross-table, cross-schema, and then left room for future cross-database functionality.

MySQL aliases schema with database behind the scenes, such that CREATE SCHEMA and CREATE DATABASE are analogs. It can therefore be said that MySQL has implemented cross-database functionality, skipped schema functionality entirely, and provided similar functionality into their implementation of a database. In summary, PostgreSQL fully supports schemas and multi-tenancy by strictly separating databases from each other and thus lacks some functionality MySQL has with databases, while MySQL does not even attempt to support standard schemas.

Oracle has its own spin where creating a user is synonymous with creating a schema. Thus a database administrator can create a user called PROJECT and then create a table PROJECT.TABLE. Users can exist without schema objects, but an object is always associated with an owner (though that owner may not have privileges to connect to the database). With the 'shared-everything' Oracle RAC architecture, the same database can be opened by multiple servers concurrently. This is independent of replication, which can also be used, whereby the data is copied for use by different servers. In the Oracle implementation, a 'database' is a set of files which contains the data while the 'instance' is a set of processes (and memory) through which a database is accessed.

Informix supports multiple databases in a server instance like MySQL. It supports the CREATE SCHEMA syntax as a way to group DDL statements into a single unit creating all objects created as a part of the schema as a single owner. Informix supports a database mode called ANSI mode which supports creating objects with the same name but owned by different users.

PostgreSQL and some other databases have support for foreign schemas, which is the ability to import schemas from other servers as defined in ISO/IEC 9075-9 (published as part of SQL:2008). This appears like any other schema in the database according to the SQL specification while accessing data stored either in a different database or a different server instance. The import can be made either as an entire foreign schema or merely certain tables belonging to that foreign schema. While support for ISO/IEC 9075-9 bridges the gap between the two competing philosophies surrounding schemas, MySQL and Informix maintain an implicit association between databases while ISO/IEC 9075-9 requires that any such linkages be explicit in nature.

== See also ==
- Relational database management system (includes market share data)
- List of relational database management systems
- Comparison of object–relational database management systems
- Comparison of database administration tools
- Object database – some of which have relational (SQL/ODBC) interfaces.
- IBM Business System 12 – an historical RDBMS and related query language.
- DB-Engine Ranking list
