= Large object =

Large object may refer to:

- Binary large object, a collection of binary data stored as a single entity
- Character large object, a collection of character data in a database management system
