= LucidDB =

- Developer: Eigenbase Foundation
- Stable release: 0.9.4 / 2012-01-05
- Repository: github.com/LucidDB/luciddb
- Written in: Java, C++
- Type: Database, Business intelligence, Data Warehouse
- License: GPL 2
- Website: luciddb.sourceforge.net

LucidDB is an open-source database purpose-built to power data warehouses, OLAP servers and business intelligence systems. According to the product website, its architecture is based on column-store, bitmap indexing, hash join/aggregation, and page-level multiversioning.

== Overview ==
Purpose-built for data warehousing, OLAP, and business intelligence, LucidDB is a "columnar Business Intelligence database". It handles ETL functionality using extensions to ANSI SQL, by using 'wrappers' around a range of data sources (databases, text files, Web services, etc.), allowing them to be queried as though they were all databases. It can also be used for enterprise information integration. LucidDB uses the Optiq query planning and execution framework.

LucidDB achieves high performance by automatically identifying required indexes and creating them on the fly without the need for manual intervention. It includes a bulk loader that permits merge and update operations as well as insert.

LucidDB server is licensed under GPL, while LucidDB client is licensed under LGPL.

== Current status ==
It appears that LucidDB is no longer being maintained based on its GitHub entry. The SourceForge page has not been updated since 2010.

LucidDB has had a long run as the first pure play open source column store database. However, with no commercial sponsors and no ongoing community activity it's time to OFFICIALLY shut the doors. There will be no future code, or binary releases (this repository may disappear [sic] at some point) of luciddb. All assets (wiki, issues, etc) will likely start coming down as well over the course of 2014. Appreciate all the effort by all those involved with LucidDB.

Optiq, has given home and new life to portions of the LucidDB codebase. If you're interested in speaking SQL to NoSQL sources please checkout [sic] the Optiq project.

== Connectors ==
- JDBC driver
- ADO.NET provider
