= MaxDB =

Relational database management system

- Developer: SAP
- Stable release: 7.9.10.12 / February 2024; 2 years ago
- Written in: C++
- Operating system: Cross-platform
- Available in: English
- Type: RDBMS
- License: SAP freeware license agreement for MaxDB (closed source)
- Website: maxdb.sap.com

MaxDB is an ANSI SQL-92 (entry level) compliant relational database management system (RDBMS) from SAP AG, which was also delivered by MySQL AB from 2003 to 2007. MaxDB is targeted for large SAP environments e.g. mySAP Business Suite, and other applications that require enterprise-level database functionality.

== History ==
The database development started in 1977 as a research project at Technische Universität Berlin headed by Rudolf Munz. In the early 1980s it became a database product that was subsequently owned by Nixdorf Computer, Siemens-Nixdorf, Software AG and today by SAP AG. It has at various times been named VDN, RDS, Reflex, Supra 2, DDB/4, Entire SQL-DB-Server and Adabas D. In 1997 SAP acquired the software from Software AG and developed it as SAP DB, releasing the source code under the GNU General Public License in October 2000.

In 2003 SAP AG and MySQL AB jointly re-branded the database system as MaxDB. In October 2007 this reselling agreement was terminated and sales and support of the database were reverted to SAP. SAP AG now manages MaxDB development, distribution, and support. New versions of the source code of MaxDB are no longer available under the GNU General Public License. SAP also stated that "Further commercial support concepts to cover mission critical use requirements outside of SAP scenarios are currently subject to discussion."

MaxDB since version 7.5 is based on the code base of SAP DB 7.4. Therefore, the MaxDB software version 7.5 can be used as a direct upgrade of previous SAP DB versions starting at 7.2.04 and higher.

SAP has announced that there will be no minor or major updates after version 7.9. SAP is sunsetting the product, favoring the HANA database instead .

== Features ==
MaxDB is delivered with a set of administration and development tools. Most tools are available with both a GUI and command line interface (CLI). It offers bindings for JDBC; ODBC; SQLDBC (native C/C++ interface); precompiler; PHP; Perl; Python; WebDAV; OLE DB, ADO, DAO, RDO and .NET via ODBC; Delphi and Tcl via Third Party Programming Interfaces. MaxDB is cross-platform, offering releases for HP-UX, IBM AIX, Linux, Solaris, Windows 2000, Windows Server 2003, and up to Windows 10.

MaxDB offers built-in hot backup, does not need any online reorganizations and claims to be SQL 92 Entry-Level compatible.

MaxDB since version 7.7.00, uses multiversion concurrency control (MVCC) instead of the previous lock based implementation.

== Licensing ==
MaxDB was licensed under the GNU General Public License (GPL) from versions 7.2 through 7.6. Programming interfaces were licensed under the GPL with exceptions for projects released under other open source licenses.

SAP DB 7.3 and 7.4 were licensed as GPL but with LGPL drivers. MaxDB 7.5 was offered under dual licensing, i.e. licensed as GPL with GPL drivers or a commercial license.

From version 7.5 through version 7.6 onwards distribution of MaxDB (previously SAP DB) to the open source community was provided by MySQL AB, the same company that develops the open-source software database, MySQL. Development was done by SAP AG, MySQL AB and the open-source software community.

In October 2007 SAP assumed full sales and commercial support for MaxDB. MaxDB 7.6 is now closed source, available free-of-charge (without support, and with usage restrictions) for use with non-SAP applications.

== See also ==
- Comparison of database administration tools
- Comparison of relational database management systems
- List of relational database management systems
