= Adabas D =

- Original author(s): SQL-Datenbanksysteme GmbH and Siemens Nixdorf AG
- Developer(s): Software AG
- Preview release: 15.01
- Operating system: Windows XP, Windows 2000 (Professional, Server, & Advanced Server), Windows Server 2003 (Standard & Enterprise Edition), Linux, AIX, HP-UX 11i and Solaris
- Type: relational database management system
- Website: http://www.adabasd.com/

Adabas D is a relational database management system owned by Software AG since 1994, when Software AG acquired SQL-Datenbanksysteme GmbH from Siemens Nixdorf AG.

SAP AG's MaxDB is based on ADABAS D version 6.1.15.57, licensed from Software AG in 1997, and originally sold as SAP DB. MaxDB is provided for use with SAP, as an alternative to other more costly RDBMS systems.

Star Division (and later Sun Microsystems) used Adabas D for its product StarOffice, and the personal edition of Adabas D was included in SuSE Linux. An Adabas D adapter was provided in OpenOffice.org.

== See also ==
- ADABAS
- MaxDB
