= SQream DB =

Relational database management system

SQream
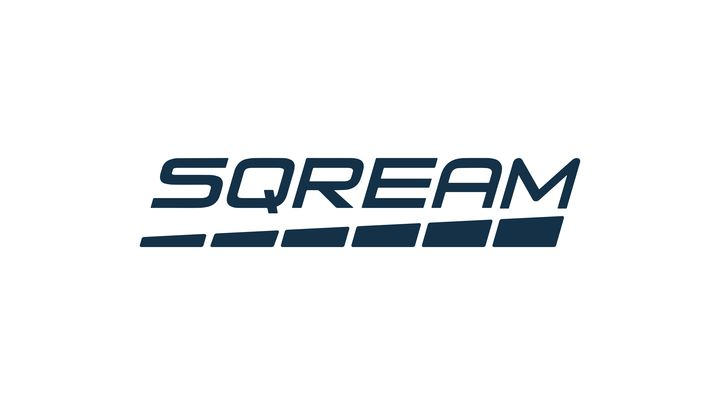
- SQream Technologies Logo
- Developer: SQream Technologies Ltd.
- Initial release: 2014; 12 years ago
- Stable release: 2021.2 / 13 September 2021; 4 years ago
- Written in: CUDA, C++, Haskell
- Operating system: Linux
- Platform: x86-64
- Type: RDBMS
- License: proprietary
- Website: sqream.com

SQream is a relational database management system (RDBMS) that uses graphics processing units (GPUs) from Nvidia. SQream is designed for big data analytics using the Structured Query Language (SQL).

== History ==
SQream is the first product from SQream Technologies Ltd, a company founded in 2010 by Ami Gal and Kostya Varakin in Tel Aviv, Israel.

SQream was first released in 2014 after a partnership with an Orange S.A. in Silicon Valley. The firm claimed Orange S.A. saved $6 million by using SQream in 2014. SQream is aimed at the budget multi-terabyte analytics market, due to its modest hardware requirements and use of compression.

SQream is also the basis for a product named GenomeStack, for querying many DNA sequences simultaneously. A US$7.4M investment of venture capital was announced in June 2015. It is an example of general-purpose computing on graphics processing units, alongside OmniSci and Kinetica.

The firm applied for patents, encompassing parallel execution queries on multi-core processors and speeding up parallel execution on vector processors.

In February 2018, SQream Technologies partnered with Alibaba Group's division Alibaba Cloud to deliver a GPU database service on Alibaba Cloud.

In December 2021, SQream announced that it had acquired no-code data platform Panoply for an undisclosed sum, as part of the push to grow its cloud computing offering.

== Software and features ==
The column-oriented database SQream platform was designed to manage large, fast-growing volumes of data, for compute-intensive queries. The product claims to improve query performance for very large datasets, over traditional relational database systems.

SQream is designed to run on premise or in the public cloud.
