= Expression index =

Within computing and computer science, an expression index, also known as a function based index, is a database index that is built on a generic expression, rather than one or more columns. This allows indexes to be defined for common query conditions that depend on data in a table, but are not actually stored in that table.

A common use for an expression index is to support case-insensitive searching or constraints. For example, if a web site wants to make user names case-insensitive, but still preserve the case as originally entered by the user, an index can be created on the lower-case representation of the user name:

CREATE INDEX users__last_name_lower ON users( lower( last_name ) );

That will create a unique index on "lower(last_name)". Any queries that search on "lower(last_name)" could then make use of that index:

SELECT user_id FROM users WHERE lower( last_name ) = lower( 'Smith' );

== Database support ==
Major databases which support expression indexes include: IBM Db2 (since version 10.5), Oracle Database (since release 8i.) and PostgreSQL (since at least version 7).
