= Set operations (SQL) =

Type of operation in SQL

Set operations in SQL is a type of operations which allow the results of multiple queries to be combined into a single result set.

Set operators in SQL include UNION, INTERSECT, and EXCEPT, which mathematically correspond to the concepts of union, intersection and set difference.

== UNION operator ==
In SQL the UNION clause combines the results of two SQL queries into a single table of all matching rows. The two queries must result in the same number of columns and compatible data types in order to unite. Any duplicate records are automatically removed unless UNION ALL is used.

UNION can be useful in data warehouse applications where tables are not perfectly normalized. A simple example would be a database having tables sales2005 and sales2006 that have identical structures but are separated because of performance considerations. A UNION query could combine results from both tables.

Note that UNION ALL does not guarantee the order of rows. Rows from the second operand may appear before, after, or mixed with rows from the first operand. In situations where a specific order is desired, ORDER BY must be used.

Note that UNION ALL may be much faster than plain UNION.

=== Examples ===
Given these two tables:

sales2005
person	amount
Joe	1000
Alex	2000
Bob	5000

sales2006
person	amount
Joe	2000
Alex	2000
Zach	35000

Executing this statement:

SELECT * FROM sales2005
UNION
SELECT * FROM sales2006;

yields this result set, though the order of the rows can vary because no ORDER BY clause was supplied:

person	amount
Joe	1000
Alex	2000
Bob	5000
Joe	2000
Zach	35000

Note that there are two rows for Joe because those rows are distinct across their columns. There is only one row for Alex because those rows are not distinct for both columns.

UNION ALL gives different results, because it will not eliminate duplicates. Executing this statement:

SELECT * FROM sales2005
UNION ALL
SELECT * FROM sales2006;

would give these results, again allowing variance for the lack of an ORDER BY statement:

person	amount
Joe	1000
Joe	2000
Alex	2000
Alex	2000
Bob	5000
Zach	35000

The discussion of full outer joins also has an example that uses UNION.

== INTERSECT operator ==
The SQL INTERSECT operator takes the results of two queries and returns only rows that appear in both result sets. For purposes of duplicate removal the INTERSECT operator does not distinguish between NULLs. The INTERSECT operator removes duplicate rows from the final result set. The INTERSECT ALL operator does not remove duplicate rows from the final result set, but if a row appears X times in the first query and Y times in the second, it will appear $\min(X,Y)$ times in the result set.

=== Example ===
The following example INTERSECT query returns all rows from the Orders table where Quantity is between 50 and 100.

SELECT *
FROM   Orders
WHERE  Quantity BETWEEN 1 AND 100

INTERSECT

SELECT *
FROM   Orders
WHERE  Quantity BETWEEN 50 AND 200;

== EXCEPT operator ==
The SQL EXCEPT operator takes the distinct rows of one query and returns the rows that do not appear in a second result set. For purposes of row elimination and duplicate removal, the EXCEPT operator does not distinguish between NULLs. The EXCEPT ALL operator does not remove duplicates, but if a row appears X times in the first query and Y times in the second, it will appear $\max(X - Y, 0)$ times in the result set.

Notably, the Oracle platform provides a MINUS operator which is functionally equivalent to the SQL standard EXCEPT DISTINCT operator.

=== Example ===
The following example EXCEPT query returns all rows from the Orders table where Quantity is between 1 and 49, and those with a Quantity between 76 and 100.

Worded another way; the query returns all rows where the Quantity is between 1 and 100, apart from rows where the quantity is between 50 and 75.

SELECT *
FROM   Orders
WHERE  Quantity BETWEEN 1 AND 100

EXCEPT

SELECT *
FROM   Orders
WHERE  Quantity BETWEEN 50 AND 75;

=== Example ===
The following example is equivalent to the above example but without using the EXCEPT operator.

SELECT o1.*
FROM (
    SELECT *
    FROM Orders
    WHERE Quantity BETWEEN 1 AND 100) o1
LEFT JOIN (
    SELECT *
    FROM Orders
    WHERE Quantity BETWEEN 50 AND 75) o2
ON o1.id = o2.id
WHERE o2.id IS NULL

== See also ==
- Union (set theory)
- Join (SQL)
- SQL:2003
- Select (SQL)
