= SQL Anywhere =

Relational database management system

- Developer: SAP
- Stable release: 17.0
- Type: Database
- License: proprietary license
- Website: www.sap.com/products/sql-anywhere.html

SAP SQL Anywhere is a proprietary relational database management system (RDBMS) product from SAP. SQL Anywhere was known as Sybase SQL Anywhere prior to the acquisition of Sybase by SAP.

== History ==
The database company Sybase obtained the SQL Anywhere technology as part of its acquisition of PowerBuilder vendor PowerSoft.

== Features ==
SQL Anywhere can be run on Windows, Windows CE, Mac OS X, and various UNIX platforms, including Linux, AIX, HP-UX and Solaris. Database files are independent of the operating system, allowing them to be copied between supported platforms. The product provides several standard interfaces (ODBC, JDBC, and ADO.NET) and a number of special interfaces such as PHP and Perl. The engine supports stored procedures, user functions (using Watcom SQL, T-SQL, Java, or C/C++), triggers, referential integrity, row-level locking, replication, high availability, proxy tables, and events (scheduled and system events). Strong encryption is supported for both database files and client-server communication.

== Uses ==
SQL Anywhere is used in several contexts, including as an embedded database, particularly as an application data store. For example, it is used in Intuit QuickBooks, in network management products, and in backup products. Its ability to be used with minimal administration is a distinguishing feature in this role. It can be used as a database server for work groups or for small or medium-sized businesses. It can also function as a mobile database. It includes scalable data synchronization technology that provides change-based replication between separate databases, including large server-based RDBMS systems.

== Technologies ==
SQL Anywhere Server is a high performing and embeddable relational database-management system (RDBMS) that scales from thousands of users in server environments down to desktop and mobile applications used in widely deployed, zero-administration environments.

Ultralite: UltraLite is a database-management system designed for small-footprint mobile devices such as PDAs and smart phones.

Mobilink: MobiLink is a highly-scalable, session-based synchronization technology for exchanging data among relational databases and other non-relational data sources.

QAnywhere: QAnywhere facilitates the development of robust and secure store-and-forward mobile messaging applications.

SQL Remote: SQL Remote technology is based on a store and forward architecture that allows occasionally connected users to synchronize data between SQL Anywhere databases using a file or message transfer mechanism.

== History ==
- Initially created by Watcom as Watcom SQL.
- Version 3: 1992
- Watcom acquired by Powersoft in 1993; Watcom SQL shipped with their visual programming environment PowerBuilder
- Version 4: 1994 (Stored procedures, triggers)
- PowerSoft and Sybase merged in 1995: Watcom SQL was renamed SQL Anywhere.
- Version 5: 1995 (SQL Remote data replication; graphical administration tools)
- Version 6: 1998. Renamed Adaptive Server Anywhere (ASA). (multi-processor support, Java objects in the database)
- Version 6.0.2: 1999 (MobiLink data synchronization, UltraLite mobile database for Palm OS and Windows CE)
- Version 7: 2000 (dynamic cache, task scheduling and event handling, cross-platform administration tools)
- Version 8: 2001 (Volcano query optimizer, encrypted data storage and transmission)
- Version 9: 2003 (Index consultant, embedded HTTP server)
- Version 10: 2006 – renamed SQL Anywhere (high availability, intra-query parallelism, materialized views)
- Version 11: 2008 (full text search, BlackBerry support)
- Version 12: 2010 released by SAP Sybase (support for spatial data)
- Version 16: April 18, 2013 – (faster synchronization and improved security)
- Version 17: July 15, 2015; released by SAP
