= Omnis Studio =

Rapid application development tool

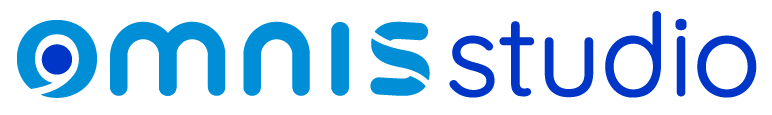
- Developer: Omnis Software
- Written in: C++
- Operating system: Cross-platform: Microsoft Windows, MacOS, Linux, iOS, Android
- Available in: English
- Type: IDE, SDK
- License: Proprietary software Professional edition Standard edition
- Website: www.omnis.net

Omnis Studio is a rapid application development (RAD) tool that allows programmers and application developers to create enterprise, web, and mobile applications for Windows, Linux, and macOS personal computers and servers across all business sectors.

The Omnis JavaScript Client allows developers to build all types of web applications and mobile applications by presenting a highly functional interface in the user's desktop web browser, or on tablet and mobile devices. The logic and database access in such web and mobile applications is handled by the Omnis server. The Omnis server also can act as a hub between database servers, services based on Java and .Net and clients like Adobe Air & Flex, transferring data in the form of XML or Web services.

== Omnis history ==
- 1979: On August 1 Geoff Smith and Paul Wright founded Blyth Computer Services (later renamed Blyth Software Ltd, then Omnis Software) in Wenhaston, Suffolk, in the UK, which became the first Apple dealership in East Anglia. Paul Wright was the nephew of Peter Harold Wright.
- 1981: In December Blyth released its first "OMNIS" product, a database application tool for the Apple II designed by David Seaman and written using Apple Pascal. OMNIS was also developed at the time using the UCSD Pascal environment which enabled a simple port over to other popular machines of the time. The company was later renamed Blyth Software.
- 1984: OMNIS 1, 2 and 3 were released together in April 1984 as a suite of Omnis products. Omnis 1 ("the file manager"), was intended to be an easy-to-use way of handling simple data, i.e. non-relational data. Omnis 2 ("the information manager"), was similar to the original Omnis but had more programmability. Omnis 3 ("the database manager") was designed for programmers and business owners to build their own customized applications. At about that time Blyth Software also produced the Blyth Accounting packages based on the Omnis 3 engine to enable Accounting for small businesses. Omnis 3 was one of the first cross-platform database application tools for Apple computers and IBM compatibles running under MS-DOS.
- 1984: (May) Blyth Software Inc. was incorporated and opened offices in San Mateo, CA.
- 1985: Following the previous year's launch of the Apple Macintosh, "Omnis 3 for Macintosh" was released in May 1985, one of the first database generation tools for the Mac. Initially as a textual product rather than a GUI. UK headquarters moved to Mitford House in Benhall, Suffolk.
- 1986: "Omnis 3 Plus for Macintosh" released in May. The "Express" module was added in 1988 to allow non-programmers to create apps.
- 1986: Released "Blyth Craftware" in December, a set of off-the-shelf business packages for the management of mailing lists, personnel, assets and stock in small businesses.
- 1987: "Omnis Accounting" released in the UK in February.
- 1987: Released "Omnis Quartz", one of the first GUI databases for Microsoft Windows.
- 1987: Blyth Holdings Inc was created & floated on NASDAQ raising $7m.
- 1988: Paul Wright was its chairman and chief executive officer.
- 1989: Released Omnis 5, one of the first cross-platform development tools for building applications under Windows and Mac.
- 1991/93/94: Released Omnis 7 v1, v2, and v3 in near consecutive years, an integrated development environment providing client/server access to many industry standard server databases such as Oracle, Sybase, and Informix. Omnis 7 version 1 for Mac released Dec 1991, and Windows early 1992. Version 2 added an IDE shell and the so-called "dot notation" for referencing object attributes (properties and methods), and support for a VCS, CMS, ODBC connectivity, and Apple DAL support.
- 1997: Released Omnis Studio v1, a cross-platform, object oriented development environment for Windows and Mac OS. Company was renamed Omnis Software.
- 1998: Released Omnis Studio v2, a cross-platform, multi-database development environment for Windows and Mac OS.
- 1999: Released Omnis Studio v2.1 including the Omnis Web Client or "thin client" for browsing data and applications via the Web.
- 1999: Released Omnis Studio for Linux making Omnis one of the first RAD tools available under Linux, Windows, and Mac.
- 2000: Released Omnis Studio v3. Later that year Omnis Software merged with PICK Systems to become Raining Data Corporation.
- 2004: Released Omnis Studio v4 including support for MySQL, JDBC, and Java Objects.
- 2005: Released Omnis Studio v4.1 including support for Unicode.
- 2006: Release of Omnis Studio 4.2 including native support for Mac-Intel and introduction of Web Services Component
- 2007 Release of Omnis Studio 4.3 including Windows Vista and Mac OS 10.5 (Leopard) support, and component for accessing .Net objects.
- 2009 Release Omnis Studio 5.0 which includes application development for Windows Mobile-based devices, and Unicode support.
- 2010 Release Omnis Studio 5.1 which includes support for the iOS platform (iPhone, iPad)
- 2012 Release Omnis Studio 5.2 which includes a JavaScript based client for rendering applications in a browser on desktop and mobile devices.
- 2013 Release Omnis Studio 6.0 which includes significant updates to the JavaScript Client including new wrappers for creating standalone mobile apps, a new control for access to mobile device features, a new PDF printing device, enhanced JavaScript controls, and multi-tasking using SQL Worker objects.
- 2014 Release Omnis Studio 6.1 includes Native JavaScript components, tool for adapting to the different resolution for desktop and mobile devices, support for REST web services for server and client, 64 bit, improved JavaScript performance, error check for client-side methods
- 2016 Release Omnis Studio 8.0 which provides 64-bit and Cocoa support for Omnis Studio running on OS X, the ability to use HTML components in window classes for Desktop Apps, Drag and Drop capability for the JavaScript Client, a new Code Assistant available in the method editor to help you write Omnis code, plus some enhancements in the Studio Browser which will help new and existing developers.
- October 2016, the Omnis business was purchased by OLS Holdings Ltd, a UK company owned by a number of Omnis developers and distributors.
- August 2017 Release Omnis Studio 8.1 which provides GIT support, JSON controls, a new Welcome intro, Push notifications for mobile apps, responsive forms, a "headless" Linux server for deployment, and other enhancements.
- January 2019 Release Omnis Studio 10 which provides a new free-type Method Editor and Code Assistant, support for Accessibility standard WCAG 2.0, an Omnis datafile migration tool, new components for JavaScript and fat client, support for remote debugging, a new remote object class, new Worker Objects that support Node.JS JavaScript, POP3, Crypto, Hash and FTP.
- September 2019 Release Omnis Studio Version 10.1 with New and Updated JavaScript Components, New Animations for Desktop Apps, Further Improvements to Code Assistant (Method Name Matching), New Variable Panel, SQL Worker Lists, Enhancements in the management of web app sessions, improved user interaction with mobile apps with new "toast" messages, better support of the FHIR standard for medical applications.
- November 2020: support for JS client themes, SVG icons, position assistance (for alignment of visual objects), web form WYSIWYG design view, JS split button, and updates in the code editor including code folding. The Linux Headless Server can now be operated in MultiProcess Server (MPS) mode, utilizing the multi-core processor on the server. For fat client applications, new token entry control, breadcrumb control, side panels, toast messages, and updated drag & drop for system files. Support for Open API 3.0.0 and Swagger 2.0 for Web Services.
- May 2023: Omnis Studio Version 11: Redesigned interface, new components such as chart, gauge, camera, floating action button, tile grid, scroll box, color picker, side panels, multiple file uploads, improved group selection, system notifications, power management Notifications, field border icons, TOTP object for generating and checking Time-based One-Time Passwords, new image object for image manipulation and creating QR codes, Python interface, LDAP interface and new interface for system calls, spell-checking support, support for creating PDF/A levels 2 and 3.
