= SolidDB =

Database management system

UNICOM solidDB
- Developer: UNICOM Global
- License: Proprietary software
- Website: teamblue.unicomsi.com/products/soliddb/

solidDB is an in-memory relational database management system developed and sold by UNICOM Global. solidDB is designed for extreme speed as a persistent, relational in-memory database to meet performance and reliability demands of real-time applications.

== Technology ==
solidDB includes an in-memory database as well as a traditional disk based database, which both employ the same SQL interface, and a high availability option. Both in-memory and disk based engines coexist inside the same server process, and a single SQL statement can access data from both engines. The High Availability option maintains two copies of the data synchronized at all times. solidDB can be embedded directly into applications and run virtually unattended for lower total cost-of-ownership.

== Customers ==
SolidDB has historically been used as an embedded database in telecommunications equipment, network software, and similar systems. Companies using solidDB include Alcatel-Lucent, Ericsson, Cisco Systems, EMC Corporation, Hewlett-Packard, Nokia, Siemens AG and Nokia Networks.

== History ==
Solid was a privately held company founded in Helsinki, Finland in 1992. Solid was acquired by IBM in late 2007. SolidDB was sold to UNICOM Global in 2014.
