= Superbase (database) =

End-user desktop database program

- Original author: Precision Software
- Developer: Superbase Software Ltd
- Release: 1983; 43 years ago
- Operating system: Cross-platform
- Type: Database software
- License: Proprietary
- Website: www.superbase.com

Superbase is an end-user desktop database program that started on the Commodore 64 and was ported from that to various operating systems over the course of more than 20 years. It also has generally included a programming language to automate database-oriented tasks, and with later versions included WYSIWYG form and report designers as well as more sophisticated programming capabilities.

== History ==
It was originally created in 1983 by Precision Software for the Commodore 64 and 128 and later the Amiga and Atari ST. In 1989, it was the first database management system to run on Windows.

Precision Software, a UK-based company, was the original creator of the product Superbase. Superbase was and still is used by a large number of people on various platforms. It was often used only as an end-user database but a very large number of applications were built throughout industry, government, and academia and these were often of significant complexity. Some of these applications continue in use to the current day, mostly in small businesses.

The initial versions were text mode only, but with the release of the Amiga version, Superbase became the first product to use the now common VCR control panel for browsing through records. It also supported a number of different media formats, including images, sounds, and video. Superbase was often referred to as the multimedia database in early years, when such features were uncommon. The Amiga version also featured an internal language and the capability to generate front end "masks" for queries and reports, years before Microsoft Access.

This version was a huge success and that resulted in a version being created for a number of platforms using the same approach. Eventually a Microsoft Windows version was released and a couple of years later the company was sold by its founders to Software Publishing Corporation. SPC sold off the non-Windows versions of the product and after releasing version 2 and in the late alpha stages of version 3, sold the product to a company called Computer Concepts Corporation.

This relatively unknown company created a subsidiary called Superbase, Inc. and after finishing off the late stage alpha of version 3 and launching it as Superbase 95, eventually appeared to have lost interest in the product, at which point it was bought by a small group of former customers and brought back to the UK. This company, Superbase Developers plc, continued to extend and support the product through Superbase Classic. The Amiga version was sold to Mr. Hardware Computers. Joe Rothman developed and renamed the program to SBase Pro 4. Mr Hardware Computers and SBase Pro 4 were sold to Russ Norrby who put out version 1.36n being the newest version.

A new, next-generation rewrite of the product initially called Superbase Next Generation (SBNG) which included a new object-oriented programming language called SIMPOL was begun in 1999–2000. It had primarily been an alpha product; although it was billed as a beta release in 2005 with promises that a true release would be around the corner.

In 2006, SIMPOL was sold to RealBasics Ltd which was later renamed Simpol Ltd (www.simpol.com).

In April 2009 this company launched SIMPOL Professional, which is the next generation product, as a cross-platform language and database tool set.

In February 2009, it was announced that Superbase Developers plc was in liquidation.

In March 2010 Papatuo Holdings Ltd. purchased the Superbase family of products from the official receivers of Superbase Developers plc.

In 2014, Pap Holdings (formerly Papatuo Holdings) the company that purchased the Superbase intellectual property when Superbase Developers plc was liquidated in 2010 also purchased the SIMPOL intellectual property upon the liquidation of Simpol Limited. Following versions, 1.83 through 2.06, version 2.10 was released in July 2017.

In August 2018, Superbase Software Limited released a free for non-commercial version.

Since the passing of a lead developer, the project has been on hold, but the developers are working on version 3.0.

== Uses ==
Superbase has been used for very basic end-user tasks, but its real strength lies in the ability of relatively untrained programmers to create complex applications. These are typically built up over time as the need arises. The types of applications run the gamut from accounting systems, ERP/MRP packages, business information systems, production control systems, and similar complex products down to very basic membership list or contact management systems.

== Features ==
The software includes an ISAM database engine and a proprietary dialect of BASIC, along with integrated forms and report-generation tools. It can function as a frontend for one or more SQL databases. The original version was written for the 16-bit Windows API, which limited portability to 32-bit Windows systems. A subsequent "Next Generation" rewrite addressed these compatibility issues and introduced architectural changes.

From a casual programmer's perspective, the fact that the database is not based on SQL is a significant advantage, since the level of complexity is far less and it is easier for the user to grasp the concepts of how to manage and traverse the database.

There are numerous powerful features in the product, a few of them are:

- Virtual Database Tables — these only exist in memory
- Virtual Database Columns — these are calculated at access time
- Peer-to-peer Client/Server (PPCS) — this technology allows any version of Superbase to act as either a database server, a client, or both. The database tables are accessed via UDP/IP.
- Small footprint — Superbase runs on every version of Windows except the 64-bit versions and requires only a minimum of 6 MB of system RAM.

== Versions ==
- 1983 Superbase 64 for Commodore 64
- 1983 Superbase 700 for Commodore CBM-II
- 1983 Superbase version 2.0 for Apple II
- 1984 Superbase for Plus/4
- 1985 Superbase for Amiga
- 1985 Superbase 128 for Commodore 128
- 1986 Superbase for Atari ST
- 1987 Superbase for GEM on IBM PC compatibles
- 1987 Superbase 1.35 for MS-DOS
- 1988 Superbase 4 version 1.0 for Windows
- 1988 Superbase Professional 2.02 for Atari ST
- 1991 Superbase 4 version 1.31 for Windows
- 1991 Superbase 4 version 1.31 for Amiga
- 1991 Superbase Professional 3.02 for Atari ST
- 1992 Superbase version 2.0 for Windows
- 1994 Superbase 95 (version 3.0) for Windows
- 1997 Superbase version 3.2 for Windows
- 1998 Superbase version 3.5 for Windows
- 1999 Superbase version 3.6i for Windows
- 2000 SuperBase 4 Pro version 1.36 for Amiga
- 2001 Superbase 2001 for Windows
- 2003 Superbase Classic for Windows

=== Next generation rewrite ===
- 2009 SIMPOL Professional 1.0
- 2012 February SIMPOL Professional 1.6
- 2012 November SIMPOL Professional 1.7
- 2014 SIMPOL Professional 1.8
- 2016 Superbase NG 2.0
- 2016 Superbase NG 2.1

== Reception ==
Shay Addams of Ahoy! in 1984 stated that Superbase had "numerous advanced features seldom seen in a database manager for the C-64", including the database programming language. It concluded that "anyone planning on harnessing the C-64 in an office or business environment can't go wrong with SuperBase". "I found little to dislike in Superbase 2", Richard O. Mann of Compute! wrote in 1992. He said that the software used the Windows UI well; despite wishing for better documentation, Mann concluded that "the program is a good example of what Windows applications are all about".
