= ADABAS =

Database management system

Adabas, a contraction of "adaptable database system", is a database package that was developed by Software AG to run on IBM mainframes. It was launched in 1971 as a non-relational database. As of 2019, Adabas is marketed for use on a wider range of platforms, including Linux, Unix, and Windows.

Adabas can store multiple data relationships in the same table.

== History ==
Initially released by Software AG in 1971 on IBM mainframe systems using DOS/360, OS/MFT, or OS/MVT, Adabas is currently available on a range of enterprise systems, including BS2000, z/VSE, z/OS, Unix, Linux, and Microsoft Windows. Adabas is frequently used in conjunction with Software AG's programming language Natural; many applications that use Adabas as a database on the back end are developed with Natural. In 2016, Software AG announced that Adabas and Natural would be supported through the year 2050 and beyond.

Adabas is one of the three major inverted list DBMS packages, the other two being Computer Corporation of America’s Model 204 and ADR’s Datacom/DB.

== 4GL support ==
Since the 1979 introduction of Natural the popularity of Adabas databases has grown. By 1990, SAS was supporting Adabas.

== Non-relational ==
In a 2015 white paper, IBM said: "applications that are written in a pre-relational database, such as Adabas, are no longer mainstream and do not follow accepted IT industry standards". However, an Adabas database can be designed in accordance with the relational model. While there are tools and services to facilitate converting Adabas to various relational databases, such migrations are usually costly.

=== Hardware zIIP boost ===
IBM's zIIP (System z Integrated Information Processor) special purpose processors permit "direct, real-time SQL access to Adabas" (even though the data may still stored in a non-relational form).

== Adabas data model ==
Adabas is an acronym for Adaptable Data Base System (originally written in all caps; today only the initial cap is used for the product name).

Adabas is an inverted list data base, with the following characteristics or terminology:

- Works with tables (referred to as files) and rows (referred to as records) as the major organizational units.
- Columns (referred to as fields) are components of rows.
- No embedded SQL engine. SQL access via the Adabas SQL Gateway was introduced through an acquired company, CONNX, in 2004. It provides ODBC, JDBC, and OLE DB access to Adabas and enables SQL access to Adabas using COBOL programs.
- Search facilities may use indexed fields, non-indexed fields, or both.
- Does not natively enforce referential integrity constraints, and parent–child relations must be maintained by application code.
- Supports two methods of denormalization: repeating groups in a record ("periodic groups") and multiple value fields in a record ("multi-value fields").

Adabas is typically used in applications that require high volumes of data processing or in high-transaction online analytical processing environments.

Adabas access is normally through Natural modules using one of several Natural statements including READ, FIND, and HISTOGRAM. These statements generate additional commands, under the covers, like open and close file. Adabas data can also be retrieved via direct calls.

=== Example of Natural program running against Adabas ===
FIND EMPLOYEE WITH NAME = 'JONES' OR = 'BAKER'
 AND CITY = 'BOSTON' THRU 'NEW YORK'
 AND CITY NE 'CHAPEL HILL'
 SORTED BY NAME
 WHERE SALARY  < 28000
  DISPLAY NAME FIRST-NAME CITY SALARY
END-FIND 
END

In the above program, the search criteria specified in the WITH clause is processed by Adabas, whereas the additional filtering indicated by the WHERE clause is performed by Natural.

Output of program:

NAME  FIRST-NAME CITY      SALARY 
---------------------------------
BAKER PAULINE    DERBY     4450
JONES MARTHA     KALAMAZOO 21000
JONES KEVIN      DERBY     7000

== Natural (4GL) ==
Natural is a proprietary fourth-generation programming language. It was not part of the initial (1971) Adabas release.

Natural programs can be "run" interpretively or "executed" as compiled objects. Compiled programs can more directly use operating system services, and run faster.

Proponents say that Natural has evolved from a competitor of COBOL to "being in competition with Java as language of choice for writing services (SOA)."

=== About Natural ===
Natural, which includes a built-in screen-oriented editor, has two main components: the system and the language. The system is the central vehicle of communication between the user and all other components of the processing environment.

The language is structured and less procedural than conventional languages. Natural objects (programs, maps, data areas, etc.) are stored in libraries, similar in structure to a DOS directory, and can be named with identifiers up to 8 characters. Objects, even if they are of different types, cannot have the same name (within the same library).

Natural provides both online and batch execution. Batch programs can read/write up to 32 work files and print up to 32 reports. Natural also supports an interactive debugger that allows developers to step through the code and display the contents of variables.

Versions exist for z/OS, z/VSE, BS2000/OS, Linux, Unix and Windows.

=== Language features ===
Natural works not only with Adabas files, but also supports Oracle, DB2, and others.

Sample code:

DEFINE DATA LOCAL                                     
01 EMPLOYEES VIEW OF EMPLOYEES                        
  02 SALARY (1)                                       
END-DEFINE                                            
READ EMPLOYEES BY NAME                                
  AT END OF DATA                                      
    DISPLAY                                           
      MIN (EMPLOYEES.SALARY(1)) (EM=ZZZ,ZZZ,ZZ9)        
      AVER(EMPLOYEES.SALARY(1)) (EM=ZZZ,ZZZ,ZZ9)        
      MAX (EMPLOYEES.SALARY(1)) (EM=ZZZ,ZZZ,ZZ9)        
  END-ENDDATA                                         
END-READ                                              
END

Output:

Page      1                                                  18-08-22  16:42:22
                                                                               
  ANNUAL      ANNUAL      ANNUAL                                               
  SALARY      SALARY      SALARY                                               
----------- ----------- -----------                                            
                                                                               
          0     240,976   6,380,000                                            

The language is strongly-typed, using explicit typing of variables, which may be one of:

- Alphanumeric
- Numeric Zoned decimal up to 27 total digits, of which a total of 7 may be to the right of decimal point
- Packed Decimal, same limits as "Numeric")
- Integer (1, 2 or 4 bytes, ranging from -128 to 127 / -32,768 to 32,767 and -2,147,483,648 to 2,147,483,647)
- Date
- Time (which includes the date)
- Logical (True or False)
- Binary
- Control variable paralleling CICS map attribute
- Floating Point (4 or 8 bytes)

=== The system file ===
The system file is an Adabas file reserved for use by Natural, which contains, but is not limited to, the following:

- All Natural programs, both in source format (programs) and in object format (compiled), grouped in libraries;
- File Definition Modules, or Data Definition Modules (DDM), which describe the fields defined within Adabas or other databases supported by Natural as well as userviews, which are fields groupings/subsets;
- Natural error messages;
- The texts of the Help function.

The system file is not limited to Adabas. Natural can also store programs in VSAM on mainframe operating systems. Natural uses the file system on Windows and various Unix implementations.

==== Programs ====
Natural objects are identified by names up to 8 characters, the first of which must be alphabetical.

The Natural program editor allows source in rows of up to 72 positions. Lines are numbered by 4 digits. This numbering is generated by Natural during program creation. Line numbers used by the compiler and editors, and can have important logical functions in the programs.

Comments can be included in two ways:

- Full-line comments are identified by a "*" or "**" prefix.
- Annotated code lines have a "/*" - everything to its right is a comment.

Examples:

0010 * These two lines (0010 and 0020)
0020 ** are comments.
0030 FORMAT LS = 80 /* As well as this part of the line (0030)
0040 * NOTE: The "/*" form has no space between the SLASH and ASTERISK.
.
.
0200 END

"END" or "." indicates the end of a program.

A Hello World code example:

* Hello World in NATURAL
WRITE 'Hello World!'
END

== Related products ==
Most Natural installations include add-on products such as:

- Natural Security - used to administer security related to Users, Libraries and Files (tables).
- Predict - A dictionary used to define and document Files, Relationships, Programs, etc.
- Natural Construct - A code generator used to generate Natural applications.

== See also ==
- Adabas D

== Bibliography ==
- Pratt, Philip J.; Adamski, Joseph J. (1987). DATABASE SYSTEMS: Management and Design. Boston: Boyd & Fraser Publishing Company. ISBN 0-87835-227-9.
