= Linter SQL RDBMS =

Russian proprietary database system

Linter SQL
- Developer: RELEX Group
- Written in: C, C++
- Type: RDBMS
- License: Proprietary
- Website: linter.ru/en/

Linter SQL RDBMS is the main product of RELEX Group. Linter is a Russian DBMS compliant with the SQL:2003 standard and supporting the majority of operating systems, among them Windows, various versions of Unix, QNX, and others. The system enables transparent interaction between the client applications and the database server functioning in different hardware and software environments. DBMS Linter includes program interfaces for the majority of popular development tools. The system provides a high data security level allowing the user to work with secret information. Linter is the only DBMS certified by FSTEC of Russia as compliant with Class 2 data security requirements and Level 2 of undeclared feature absence control. For many years Linter has been used by Russian Ministry of Defense, Ministry of Foreign Affairs and other government bodies.

== History ==
The history of Linter dates back to 1980. The system has domestic predecessors whose developers later took direct part in the creation of Linter. By 1983, according to a state order, the Voronezh construction design office "Systemprogramm" had successfully completed the relational DBMS "BARS" under the real-time operating system "RAFOS" (RT-11 prototype) for computers of the SM set. Since 1985, the system developers accepted the mobility, compatibility and openness concept. As a result, DBMS "INTEREAL" was implemented.

The system covered a wide spectrum of hardware and software platforms, from "Electronika-85" and Intel 8086 control modules to SM1702 and "Electronika-82" computer complexes and their VAX prototypes. In 1990, the DBMS development team founded the research-and-production company "RELEX" ("Relational Expert Systems"). At this time DBMS Linter was launched.

In the late 1990s, Linter-VS 6.0 was developed as part of a project performed by RELEX for the Russian Ministry of Defense. The prototype of the system was Linter 5.7 (1999) developed by RELEX. Linter-VS 6.0 is available only for OS MSVS (mobile system of the armed forces). There also exists Linter-VS 6.0.1 developed in VNIINS based on PostgreSQL 7.2 This system is also available for OS MSVS.
RelX Embedded, a compact American/Japanese-developed version of Linter is implemented in Sony products, including a Linter phone (Sony Ericsson SO903i), as well as a Kenwood Navigation System ("HDD[Smá:t]Navi Emotional Sound" HDV-990 and HDV-790).
