= Kinetica (software) =

OLAP database developed by Kinetica DB, Inc

Kinetica (formerly GPUdb)
- Developers: Kinetica DB (formerly GIS Federal)
- Stable release: 7.2
- Platform: Cloud, On-Premise
- Type: In-Memory
- License: Proprietary
- Website: www.kinetica.com

Kinetica is a distributed, memory-first OLAP database developed by Kinetica DB, Inc. Kinetica is designed to use GPUs and modern vector processors to improve performance on complex queries across large volumes of real-time data. Kinetica is well suited for analytics on streaming geospatial and temporal data.

== Background ==
In 2009, Amit Vij and Nima Neghaban founded GIS Federal, a developer of software they called GPUdb. The GIS stood for Global Intelligence Solutions. GPUdb was initially marketed for US military and intelligence applications, at Fort Belvoir for INSCOM.

In 2014 and 2016, the analyst firm International Data Corporation mentioned Kinetica for its production deployments at the US Army and United States Postal Service, respectively. As a result of their work with USPS, IDC announced that Kinetica was the recipient of the HPC Innovation Excellence Award.

On March 3, 2016, the name of the company was changed to GPUdb to match the name of the software, and a $7 million investment was announced which included Raymond J. Lane. In September 2016, it announced another $6 million investment, and an office in San Francisco, while keeping its office in Arlington, Virginia. After adding marketing and service people, the name of both the company and product was changed to Kinetica.

In June 2017, the company announced US$50 million in Series A funding led by Canvas Ventures and Meritech Capital Partners, along with new investor Citi Ventures and existing backer Ray Lane of GreatPoint Ventures.

The company has headquarters in Arlington, Virginia and regional offices in Europe, and Asia Pacific.

== Software ==
The software is designed to run on graphics processing units such as the Tesla from Nvidia. Partners include Cisco, Dell EMC, HPE, IBM, NVIDIA, Confluent, Amazon, Microsoft, Google, and Oracle. At Kinetica's core is a distributed, memory-first relational SQL database that utilizes the processing power of CPUs with the acceleration of multi-core GPU devices to analyze and visualize data with fast (often millisecond) response times. Kinetica is designed to handle streaming, batch and historic data. Other features include graph solving algorithms, user defined functions, geospatial functions, the Advanced Analytics Workbench for deploying machine learning and deep learning algorithms, natural language processing, automatic storage tiering, and Kinetica Reveal, a web-based dashboarding tool.

== Customers ==
The United States Postal Service deployed Kinetica in to production 2014. Other public customers include Telkomsel, Softbank, GSK, Pubmatic, and OVO.
