= List of relational database management systems =

This is a list of relational database management systems.

== List of software ==
List of Relational Database Management Systems (Alphabetical Order)
Name	License
4th Dimension	Proprietary
Access Database Engine	Proprietary
Actian Vector	Proprietary
Actian Zen (PSQL)	Proprietary
Adabas D	Proprietary
Airtable	Proprietary
Altibase	Proprietary
Amazon Aurora	Proprietary
Apache Derby	Apache License 2.0
Apache Ignite	Apache License 2.0
Aster Data Systems	Proprietary
CA Datacom	Proprietary
CA IDMS	Proprietary
Clarion	Proprietary
ClickHouse	Apache License 2.0
Clustrix	Proprietary
CockroachDB	Proprietary
CrateDB	Apache License 2.0
CUBRID	Apache, BSD
DataEase	Proprietary
DataFlex	Proprietary
Dataphor	Proprietary
dBase	Proprietary
Derby (aka Java DB)	Apache License 2.0
DuckDB	MIT
Empress Embedded Database	Proprietary
EnterpriseDB	Proprietary
eXtremeDB	Proprietary
Exasol	Proprietary
Extensible Storage Engine	Proprietary
FileMaker Pro	Proprietary
Firebird	MPL/GPL/LGPL
FoundationDB	Apache License 2.0
FrontBase	Proprietary
GaussDB	Proprietary
Google Cloud Spanner	Proprietary
Greenplum	Apache License 2.0
H2	MPL/GPL/LGPL
Helix	Proprietary
HSQLDB	BSD
IBM Db2	Proprietary
IBM Lotus Approach	Proprietary
Infobright	GPL
Informix	Proprietary
Ingres	GPL
InterBase	Proprietary
InterSystems Caché	Proprietary
InterSystems IRIS Data Platform	Proprietary
Linter SQL RDBMS	Proprietary
MariaDB	GPL
MaxDB	Proprietary
Microsoft SQL Server	Proprietary
Microsoft SQL Server Express	Proprietary
Microsoft Visual FoxPro	Proprietary
Mimer SQL	Proprietary
MonetDB	MPL/GPL/LGPL
mSQL	Proprietary
MySQL	GPL
Netezza	Proprietary
NexusDB	Proprietary
NonStop SQL	Proprietary
NuoDB	Proprietary
Omnis Studio	Proprietary
OpenLink Virtuoso (Open Source Edition)	GPL
OpenLink Virtuoso Universal Server	Proprietary
Oracle database	Proprietary
Oracle Rdb for OpenVMS	Proprietary
Panorama	Proprietary
Paradox	Proprietary
Percona Server for MySQL	GPL
Percona XtraDB Cluster	GPL
Polyhedra	Proprietary
PostgreSQL	PostgreSQL License
Postgres Plus Advanced Server	Proprietary
Progress OpenEdge	Proprietary
R:Base	Proprietary
RethinkDB	Apache License 2.0
SAND CDBMS	Proprietary
SAP HANA	Proprietary
SAP Adaptive Server Enterprise	Proprietary
SAP IQ	Proprietary
SingleStore	Proprietary
Snowflake Cloud Data Warehouse	Proprietary
solidDB	Proprietary
SQL Anywhere	Proprietary
SQL Azure (Cloud SQL Server)	Proprietary
SQLBase	Proprietary
SQLite	Public Domain
SQream DB	Proprietary
SAP Advantage Database Server	Proprietary
Teradata	Proprietary
TiDB	Apache License 2.0
TimescaleDB	Apache License 2.0
TimesTen	Proprietary
Trafodion	Apache License 2.0
Transbase	Proprietary
Unisys RDMS 2200	Proprietary
UniData	Proprietary
UniVerse	Proprietary
Vectorwise	Proprietary
Vertica	Proprietary
VoltDB	AGPLv3 / Proprietary
YDB	Apache License 2.0
YugabyteDB	Apache License 2.0

- Proprietary
- Open source

=== Front-end User interfaces Only ===
- Apache OpenOffice Base
  - HSQLDB
- LibreOffice Base
  - Firebird
  - HSQLDB
- Microsoft Access
  - Access Database Engine

== Discontinued ==
- Britton Lee IDMs
- Cornerstone
- DM/BasisPlus
- Google Fusion Tables
- IBM Business System 12
- IBM System R
- MICRO Relational Database Management System
- Pick
- PRTV
- QBE
- IBM SQL/DS
- Sybase SQL Server

=== Front-end User interfaces Only ===
- OpenOffice.org Base
  - HSQLDB
- StarBase
  - Adabas D

== Relational by the Date–Darwen–Pascal Model ==
=== Current ===
- Alphora Dataphor (a proprietary virtual, federated DBMS and RAD MS .Net IDE).

=== Obsolete ===
- IBM Business System 12
- IBM IS1
- IBM PRTV (ISBL)
- Multics Relational Data Store

== See also ==
- Comparison of object–relational database management systems
- Comparison of relational database management systems
- Comparison of database administration tools
- DB-Engine Ranking list
- List of column-oriented DBMSes
- List of data science software
- List of SQL software and tools
