= List of databases using MVCC =

The following database management systems and other software use multiversion concurrency control.

== Databases ==
- Altibase
- Berkeley DB
- Cloudant
- Cloud Spanner
- Clustrix
- CockroachDB
- Couchbase
- CouchDB
- CUBRID
- IBM Db2 – since IBM DB2 9.7 LUW ("Cobra") under CS isolation level – in currently committed mode
- Drizzle
- Druid
- etcd
- Exasol
- eXtremeDB
- Firebird
- FLAIM
- FoundationDB
- GE Smallworld Version Managed Data Store
- H2 Database Engine – experimental since version 1.0.57 (2007-08-25)
- HBase
- HSQLDB – starting with version 2.0
- IBM Netezza
- Ingres
- InterBase – all versions
- LMDB
- MariaDB (MySQL fork) – when used with XtraDB, an InnoDB fork and that is included in MariaDB sources and binaries or PBXT
- MarkLogic Server – a bit of this is described in
- MemSQL
- Microsoft SQL Server – when using READ_COMMITTED_SNAPSHOT, starting with SQL Server 2005
- MonetDB
- MongoDB – when used with the WiredTiger storage engine
- MySQL – when used with InnoDB, Falcon, or Archive storage engines
- NuoDB
- ObjectDB
- ObjectStore
- Oracle Database – all versions since Oracle 4
- Oracle (née DEC) Rdb
- OrientDB
- PostgreSQL
- Postgres-XL
- REAL Server
- Realm
- RethinkDB
- SAP HANA
- SAP IQ
- ScyllaDB
- sones GraphDB
- Sybase SQL Anywhere
- TerminusDB
- TiDB
- Actian Vector
- YugabyteDB
- Zope Object Database

== Other software with MVCC ==
- JBoss Cache – v 3.0
- Ehcache – v 1.6.0-beta4
- Clojure – language software transactional memory
- Apache Jackrabbit Oak
