= List of in-memory databases =

Notable in-memory database system software includes:

Name	Developer	Availability	Client Interface	License	Description/Notes
Aerospike DBS	Aerospike Company	2012	Java, C#, C, Python, Go, Node.js, Perl, libevent, PHP, Ruby, Rust	Open Source (AGPL)	Flash-optimized in-memory open source NoSQL database.
ALTIBASE HDB	Altibase Corporation	1999	Java, C, C++, JDBC, ODBC, SQL	Proprietary	Altibase is a hybrid DBMS that combines an in-memory database with a conventional disk-resident database in a single unified engine. It supports full ACID properties and standard connectivity interfaces such as JDBC and ODBC, as well as interoperability. Altibase Corporation has recently made the decision to discontinue the Altibase 7.1 open source edition, effective March 17, 2023, on its Github page (https://github.com/Altibase/altibase).
ALTIBASE XDB	Altibase Corporation	1999	Java, C, C++, JDBC, ODBC, SQL	Proprietary	General purpose database that has high data processing speeds in main-memory alone. It comes with high-availability, replication and scalability features; three interfaces (including Direct Access Mode and Direct Access API Mode) as well as conventional client/server protocols such as TCP/IP and IPC for more complex database operations. Supports full ACID properties, standard connectivity interfaces such as JDBC and ODBC [fully supported] as well as interoperability.
Apache Ignite	Apache Software Foundation, GridGain Systems	2014	Java, SQL, JDBC, ODBC	Open Source (Apache License Version 2.0)	Apache Ignite is an in-memory computing platform that is durable, strongly consistent, and highly available with powerful SQL, key-value and processing APIs. With full SQL support, one of the main use cases for Apache Ignite is the in-memory database which scales horizontally and provides ACID transactions.
ArangoDB	ArangoDB GmbH	2011	AQL, HTTP, Java, JavaScript, PHP, Go, Scala, .Net, Python, Ruby	Business Source License 1.1	ArangoDB is a transactional native multi-model database supporting two major NoSQL data models (graph and document) with one query language. Written in C++ and optimized for in-memory computing. In addition ArangoDB integrated RocksDB for persistent storage. ArangoDB supports Java, JavaScript, Python, PHP, NodeJS, C++ and Elixir. For resilient cluster behavior, ArangoDB offers a Raft-based cluster management.
Datablitz (formerly Dali)	Bell Labs (Alcatel-Lucent)	1997		Proprietary	Dali prototype was a research project at Bell Labs. It was commercialized and used by Lucent as database for in premier wireline and wireless products.
DuckDB	DuckDB Labs	2019	C/C++, Python, R, Java, Go, Rust, Node.js, Wasm, ODBC, ADBC, and more	Open source (MIT License)	DuckDB is an in-process database system designed for high performance for analytical query workloads offers client APIs for a wide range of languages.
Exasol	Exasol AG	2000	JDBC, ODBC, ADO.NET, Python, SQL, R, Go, Rest API	Proprietary	Exasol is in-memory, column-oriented analytical relational database management system which is developed by Exasol AG.
Ehcache	Terracotta, Inc. (Software AG)	2006	Java	Open source (Apache License)	For Java, distributed
eXtremeDB	McObject	2001	SQL, Lua, C, C++, C#, Java, Python	Proprietary	Cross-platform, including Linux, Windows, RTOS and server platforms. Interfaces include type-safe, native C/C++; native Java & .NET; SQL/ODBC/JDBC. Specialized editions for (for example) clustering, high availability, 64-bit support, and hybrid (in-memory and persistent) storage. eXtremeDB Financial Edition implements columnar data handling, vector-based statistical function library, integrated performance monitoring.
H2 (DBMS)	H2		Java, ODBC, JDBC	Open Source (Mozilla Public License or Eclipse Public License)	For Java
HSQLDB	HSQL Development Group	2001	Java, SQL, ODBC	Open Source (BSD License)	Relational, for Java
Hazelcast	Hazelcast Team		Java, C#, C++, Node.js, Python, Go	Open Source (Apache License 2.0)	Hazelcast is an in-memory computing platform that runs applications with extremely high throughput and low latency requirements. It offers speed, scale, simplicity, resiliency, and security in a distributed architecture. It consists of an in-memory data grid and a distributed stream processing engine that work together to run many types of data processing workloads.
Informix Warehouse Accelerator	IBM		JDBC, SQL	Proprietary	IWA supports Dynamic In-memory (in-memory columnar processing) Parallel Vector Processing, Actionable Compression, and Data Skipping technologies, collectively called "Blink Technology" by IBM (the same technology underlying IBM BLU Acceleration). The Informix Advanced Enterprise and Advanced Workgroup Editions include IWA. Released: March 2011.
IBM Db2	IBM	1991	ODBC, JDBC, C, C++, Python	Proprietary	IBM BLU Acceleration
InfinityDB	Boiler Bay Inc.	2002	Java, HTTP,	Proprietary	Java extended standard ConcurrentNavigableMap NoSQL with caching, durability, transactions, compression.
Infinispan	Infinispan team, Sponsored by Red Hat.	2009	Java, .Net, REST, RESP Protocol, Memcached	Open Source (Apache License 2.0)	Infinispan is a distributed in-memory database offering caching, persistence, transactions, querying, Redis and Memcached compatible, and cloud-native scalability (cross-site replication).
Kinetica	Kinetica (formerly GIS Federal)	2014	C++, C#, Java, JavaScript, Node.js. Python, HTTP	Proprietary	GPU-accelerated, in-memory, distributed database for analytics. Functions like a RDBMS (structured data) for fast analytics on datasets in the hundreds of GBs to tens of TBs range. Interact with SQL and REST API. Geospatial objects and functions. UDF framework allows for custom code and machine learning workloads to run in-database. Received $50mil Series A funding in June 2017.
Memcached	Danga Interactive	2003	Proprietary text and binary protocols in any language	Open Source (BSD)	Hashtable with LRU purge
SingleStore (formerly MemSQL)	SingleStore, Inc.			Proprietary	SQL relational
Microsoft COM+ IMDB	Microsoft Corporation			Proprietary	Defunct
Microsoft SQL Server	Microsoft	2012		Proprietary	In SQL Server 2014, a feature codenamed Hekaton, and named In Memory OLTP, provided limited memory optimization, which can be used in conjunction with natively compile stored procedures which are persisted as C. In SQL Server 2012, an in-memory technology called xVelocity column-store indexes targeted for data-warehouse workloads.
Mimer SQL	Mimer Information Technology		SQL, ODBC, JDBC, ADO.NET, Embedded SQL, C, C++, Python	Proprietary	Mimer SQL is a general purpose relational database server that can be configured to run fully in-memory. Mimer SQL has full ACID support, support for stored procedures and is the only database that has a full score on SQL compliance
Mnesia	Ericsson	2014		Open Source Erlang License	Mnesia is a distributed, soft real-time database management system written in the Erlang programming language. It is distributed as part of the Open Telecom Platform.
MonetDB	MonetDB Solutions, CWI	2004	SQL, ODBC, JDBC, C, C++, Java, Python, PHP, Node.js, Perl, Ruby, R, MAL	open-source MonetDB License, based on MPL 2.0 as of version Jul2015.	in-memory optimized column-oriented relational database management system (RDBMS) written in C with an SQL top-level interface and ODBC, JDBC drivers
MongoDB	MongoDB, Inc.	2015	C, C++, C#, Java, PHP, Python, Go, Node.js, Ruby, Rust, Scala, Swift, Typescript	Proprietary	MongoDB's in-memory capabilities are provided by the WiredTiger storage engine, which stores frequently used data in RAM for fast access, and by the optional In-Memory Storage Engine, a non-persistent engine designed for ultra-low-latency workloads.
MySQL NDB Cluster	MySQL	1997		Dual license open source(GNU-GPLv2) and optional proprietary	Highly available distributed real-time in-memory NoSQL database. Often used with MySQL for SQL cross-shard parallel query processing.
OmniSci	OmniSci (formerly MapD)	2013		Open Source (Apache License 2.0)	GPU-accelerated, SQL database and visualization platform for real-time analytics. Product consists of the core database plus a BI visualization tool. Received $55mil Series C funding in Aug 2018. v4.8 announced in August 2019 with support for JupyterLab.
Oracle RDBMS	Oracle Corporation	2014		Proprietary	RDBMS Oracle 12c contains an option for in-memory technology (additional licenses required).
Oracle Coherence	Oracle Corporation			Proprietary with developer download	For Java, relational, distributed
Perst	McObject	2006	Java, Android, .NET	[Dual_license] open source(GNU-GPLv3) and optional proprietary	Object-oriented embedded database system for Java, Android and .NET platforms. No ORM. Schema evolution, XML export/import, replication, specialized indexes, including full text, b-tree, t-tree, r-tree, patricia trie, kd-tree and time series
Polyhedra	ENEA AB (previously Perihelion Software)	1993		Proprietary, with a free-to-use edition (Polyhedra Lite)	Relational (SQL, ODBC, JDBC) in-memory database system originally developed for use in SCADA and embedded systems, but used in a variety of other applications including financial systems. Supports data durability via snapshots and journal logging, and high availability via a hot-standby. First released in 1993; version 8.7 released in March 2013. Polyhedra Lite appeared with a free-to-use license in 2012.
Redis	Redis Labs	2009	C, C++, Python, Lua, C#, etc.	Redis Source Available License v2 (RSALv2) and the Server Side Public License v1 (SSPLv1)	Redis is a source-available software project that implements data structure servers. It is networked, in-memory, and stores keys with optional durability.
SafePeak	SafePeak Technologies			Proprietary	Automated In-Memory Dynamic Caching for SQL Server OLTP applications and databases. Code-free, Dynamic Caching, Relational
SAP HANA	SAP SE	2012		Proprietary	SAP HANA, short for 'High Performance Analytic Appliance' is an in-memory, column-oriented, relational database management system written in C, C++
solidDB	Unicom Global	1992		Proprietary	Relational with standard SQL support. ODBC and JDBC interfaces. Includes in-memory and on-disk tables in the same engine. Supports high availability.
SQL CE	Microsoft Corporation			Free	Compact relational embedded database produced by Microsoft for applications that run on mobile devices and desktops. ADO.NET, OLE DB. No ODBC driver.
SQLite	SQLite			Open Source (Public domain)	SQL database that supports in-memory storage with the :memory: connection string.
Tarantool	Mail.ru Group	2010		Open Source (BSD)	In-memory database and application server (data grid)
TerminusDB	TerminusDB (formerly DataChemist)	2019	JavaScript, Python, Prolog, Rust, JSON-LD	Open Source (Apache 2.0)	Open source in-memory graph database designed for knowledge graph representation
TimesTen	now Oracle Corporation	1997	Java, JDBC, ODBC, SQL, PLSQL, C	Proprietary	Standalone database or in-memory cache for Oracle Database
TPF (Transaction Processing Facility)	IBM	1979		Marketed	Generalized extension of IBM Airlines reservation system. IBM's DB/DC system backed up the in-memory transaction processing computer.
Starcounter	Starcounter AB	2014		Proprietary	In-memory database engine combined with an application server that melds the Virtual Machine and the Database Management System.
VoltDB	VoltDB Inc.			Open Source (GPL) / Proprietary	Relational; implements H-Store design
Xeround	Xeround Inc.			Proprietary / Not for sale, service only	Cloud database, defunct as of 2014
