= Isql =

In database computing, various utilities for accessing SQL-based databases use variants of the isql moniker - often with an implication of running interactive SQL. They include:

- isql, a Sybase client
- isql, a unixODBC program
- iSQL, an Altibase utility
- iSQL*Plus, a web-based interface to Oracle's SQL*Plus
- ISQL, Informix SQL - an Informix tool
- ISQL, InterBase SQL command utility
- ISQL, a command-line interface for Microsoft SQL Server
