= Microsoft COM+ IMDB =

At TechEd 1999 conference during its rollout of Windows 2000 Beta, Microsoft introduced COM+ in-memory database (IMDB) that provided an application with fast access to data through databases that supported OLE DB connectivity, without incurring the overhead associated with storing and accessing data to and from physical disks.

"We're setting aside a cache of memory on the machine that's running your application for data from a database on another platform," says Michael Gross, product manager for COM+. "You'll be running your application on a Windows 2000 machine, but you may be actually accessing the data from an Oracle database on another platform."

Microsoft did not intend to offer IMDB separately from COM+. "There are no current plans to productize the IMDB separately, or incorporate it into SQL Server in the near future," Gross says. He noted then that SQL Server 6.5 and SQL Server 7.0—along with Oracle7, Oracle8, Sybase Enterprise, Informix 8, and Microsoft ADO — would be able to serve as back-end data stores for the IMDB. Microsoft's IMDB also supports the OLE DB for an ODBC provider.

== Competition ==
However, soon after the rollout of Windows 2000, several already delivering IMDB vendors had come forward with main-memory database systems that run on 32-bit Windows NT systems. TimesTen Performance Software—a Hewlett-Packard Co. spin-off—offered a main-memory database for Windows NT and Unix. Angara Database Systems Inc. also had demonstrated an RDBMS. Empress Software Inc.’s Empress RDBMS for Windows NT intermixed main memory and disk storage mechanisms to achieve increased speed.

== Demise ==
Microsoft's COM+ division's IMDB solution never made it past Windows 2000 Beta release, because it was squelched by Microsoft's SQL Server division for several reasons:

- Initial tests showed that Microsoft's IMDB performed better with Oracle7 and Oracle8 than with Microsoft's products SQL Server 6.5 and SQL Server 7.0 and ADO.
- It was a skunkworks project produced by Microsoft's COM+ division, and Microsoft's SQL Server division had more political clout.
- Proven competition TimesTen
