= ISBL =

ISBL (Information Systems Base Language) is the relational algebra notation that was invented for PRTV, one of the earliest database management systems to implement E.F. Codd's relational model of data.

There are six main operations in ISBL that derive their names from relational algebra but are more generalized in action than their namesakes. These are selection, projection, union, intersection, difference and join.

== Example ==
OS = ORDERS * SUPPLIERS
LIST OS: NAME="Brooks" % SNAME, ITEM, PRICE

== See also ==
- IBM Business System 12 - An IBM industrial strength relational DBMS influenced by ISBL. It was developed for use by customers of IBM's time-sharing service bureaux in various countries in the early 1980s.
