= Hekaton =

Hekaton may refer to:

- Hekatonkheires, three giants in Greek mythology
- Hekaton (database), an in-memory database for OLTP
