= TransLattice =

Database software company

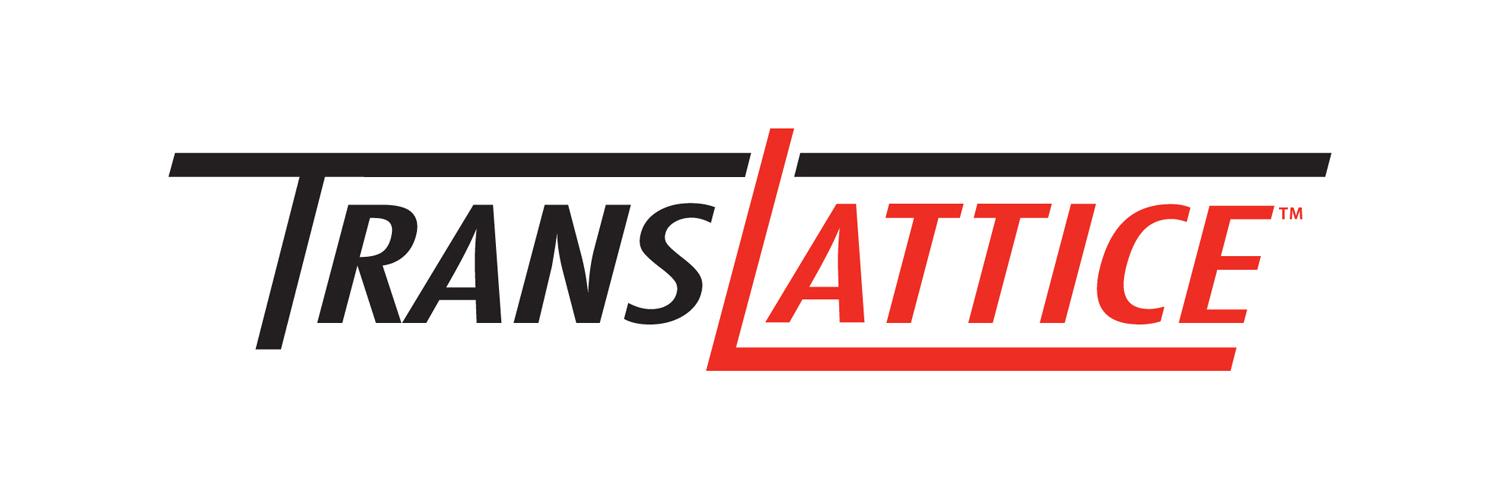
- Industry: Relational Database Management System (RDBMS)
- Founded: 2007
- Founder: Frank Huerta
- Defunct: 2016
- Fate: Appears to have gone defunct sometime around 2016
- Headquarters: Santa Clara, California, United States
- Key people: Frank Huerta, Founder & CEO Michael Lyle, Executive Vice President of Engineering and Co-Founder Louise Funke, Vice President of Marketing Melissa Conaulty, Vice President of Strategic Alliances
- Products: TransLattice Elastic Database (TED) TransLattice Application Platform (TAP) TransLattice Application Kit (TAK)
- Number of employees: 20+
- Website: web.archive.org/web/20150314201212/http://www.translattice.com/

TransLattice was a software company based in Santa Clara, California that operated from 2007 to around 2016. It geographically distributed databases and applications for enterprise, cloud, and hybrid environments. TransLattice offered a NewSQL database and an application platform, and was responsible for making Postgres-XL open source.

== History ==
TransLattice was founded in 2007 and officially launched in 2010. The company co-founders are Frank Huerta, CEO, Michael Lyle, Executive VP of Engineering and Robert Geiger, who previously worked together at Recourse Technologies. TransLattice was based in Santa Clara, California.

In August 2008 the company received $9.5 million in series A funding from DCM, an early stage capital venture funding company.

In 2013, TransLattice acquired StormDB, a database-as-a-service startup. StormDB's clustered PostgreSQL fork was open sourced in 2014 under the name Postgres-XL.

The company appears to have gone defunct somewhere between 2014 and 2016, with the website hosting expiring in 2016 and updates on the company's Twitter page ceasing in 2014, due to being unable to build a business around their TransLattice Elastic Database management system. Frank Huerta, the CEO, now works at a different company named Curtail.

== Technology ==
TransLattice specialized in distributed databases and application platforms for enterprise and cloud IT systems. The company has developed a geographically-distributed computing-architecture that allows a single database to run on multiple nodes located anywhere.

The TransLattice Elastic Database (TED), a NewSQL database management system, enables the building of a "highly available, fault tolerant data fabric comprised of multiple nodes that can be located anywhere in the world". The TransLattice database is fully SQL/ACID-compliant. TED operates as "a cohesive, single database".

TransLattice provided the world's first geographically-distributed relational database management system (RDBMS) to deploy on multiple public-cloud-provider networks at the same time, as well as on virtual machines, physical hardware or any combination thereof.
