= Barry S. Morris =

American businessman

Barry Morris
- Education: Oxford University
- Known for: General Manager at Amazon Web Services

Barry Morris is a General Manager at Amazon Web Services and former CEO of multiple public and private software companies.

== Early life and education ==
Barry Morris was raised in South Africa and educated in Great Britain. He has a degree in engineering from New College in Oxford University and an honorary doctorate in business administration from the IMC Association.

== Career ==
Before 1994, Morris held management positions at Digital Equipment Corporation, Lotus Development Corporation, Protek Electronics Ltd., and Leading Technology, Inc.

Morris joined IONA Technologies, a distributed object technology company based in Dublin, Ireland, in 1994 and served as Vice President of Product Management and Chief Operating Officer before being named CEO in 2000. Morris is credited with establishing the company headquarters in Waltham, Massachusetts.

Barry Morris was also the former CEO of StreamBase Systems, the co-founder and former CEO of NuoDB, and CEO of Undo

== Board memberships ==
Barry Morris has served on the Advisory Board for the Irish American Business Association. He has also Chaired the board of the International School of Boston and served on the board of the Sugan Theater Company.
