= IODBC =

iODBC
- Developers: OpenLink Software, Ke Jin
- Stable release: 3.52.14 / 2021-02-21
- Operating system: Cross-platform
- Type: Data Access API
- License: BSD, LGPL
- Website: www.iodbc.org
- Repository: github.com/openlink/iODBC

iODBC is an open-source initiative managed by OpenLink Software. It is a platform-independent ODBC SDK and runtime offering that enables the development of ODBC-compliant applications and drivers outside the Windows platform. The prime goals of this project are as follows:

- Simplify the effort of porting ODBC applications from Windows to other platforms
- Simplify the effort of porting ODBC drivers from Windows to other platforms
- Create consistent ODBC-utilization experience across all platforms

== History ==
iODBC emerged from a cooperative effort between OpenLink Software and Ke Jin. OpenLink Software produced a Driver Manager-less ODBC SDK that it branded as Universal DataBase Connectivity (UDBC) in 1993, because of the sporadic nature of shared library implementations across Unix platforms. Ke Jin used UDBC as inspiration for building a Driver Manager for ODBC outside the windows platform.

Over time Ke Jin and OpenLink Software decided to merge this effort into a single open-source offering under the LGPL license.

This process occurred at a time when the Free Software Foundation sought to have iODBC as a GPL offering. The delay in determining final licensing status for iODBC led to the emergence of UnixODBC and led to a fork in the platform-independent ODBC SDK and runtime that exists today. Drivers and applications written using either SDK have remained compatible (a tribute to both projects).
