= MSQL =

Mini SQL or mSQL
- Developer: Hughes Technologies
- Stable release: 4.4 / October 20, 2021; 4 years ago
- Written in: C
- Operating system: Cross-platform
- Available in: English
- Type: RDBMS
- License: Proprietary
- Website: www.hughestech.com.au/products/msql/

Mini SQL (abbreviated mSQL) is a lightweight database management system from Hughes Technologies.

== History ==
In 1993–94 David Hughes developed a network monitoring and management system called Minerva. The design of this system required a database management system to store its configuration and working data. To enable future portability, Hughes elected to use a Structured Query Language interface between the application and the database management system, despite the fact that at the time there was no free or inexpensive SQL database management implementation available. Hughes therefore developed a translation program which provided an SQL interface to the free Postgres DBMS (which did not use SQL). This product was named miniSQL, or mSQL. In time it became clear that Postgres did not perform adequately on the low-specification systems used to run Minerva, so mSQL developed into a lightweight database management system in its own right, implementing a limited subset of the SQL standard, but performing well on minimally specified hardware.

mSQL was the first low-cost SQL-based database management system. Combined with the free Linux operating system, the availability of relatively powerful low-cost PC hardware, and the development of World Wide Web standards and technologies, mSQL was an important factor in the early development of interactive, dynamic web applications, particularly in the period 1994–1997, after which it was increasingly supplanted by the more highly featured MySQL. mSQL had a large and widespread install base by the late 1990s.

== License ==
Despite being offered in source code form, and being strongly associated with open source software, mSQL itself has never been offered under an open source license.

mSQL is provided free for non-commercial use. A typical license for commercial use in 1997 would cost $170, compared to a "five-digit purchase price" for its full-featured competitors.

== Current status ==
By 1996, development on mSQL began to stagnate and MySQL arose to fill that void. By 1999, MySQL had surpassed mSQL in popularity and today mSQL has less visibility. At this time the database system is more often licensed by other companies for use in their products than used by end-users directly. mSQL is actively maintained and developed primarily to support its licensees and internal use within Hughes Technologies products and projects. It is still provided under a license that allows its use free of charge for non-commercial, educational and charitable activities. mSQL 4.4 was released in October 2021.

== Host languages ==
mSQL originally supported several host languages:

- C, included with the software
- Perl
- Java via mSQL-JDBC
- Delphi
- Tcl
- PHP

== See also ==
- List of relational database management systems
- Comparison of relational database management systems
