= Hekaton (database) =

Hekaton (also known as SQL Server In-Memory OLTP) is an in-memory database for OLTP workloads built into Microsoft SQL Server. Hekaton was designed in collaboration with Microsoft Research and was released in SQL Server 2014.

Traditional RDBMS systems were designed when memory resources were expensive, and were optimized for disk storage. Hekaton is instead optimized for a working set stored entirely in main memory, but is still accessible via T-SQL like normal tables. It is fundamentally different from the "DBCC PINTABLE" feature in earlier SQL Server versions.

Hekaton was announced at the Professional Association for SQL Server (PASS) conference 2012.
