= REAL Server =

REAL Server is a relational database management system (RDBMS) built on top of the SQLite database engine.

== History ==
REAL Server evolved from the SQLite Server originally developed by SQLabs in 2004. In May 2005 Real Software, Inc., creator of Realbasic, purchased the source code and the copyrights of the SQLite Server and invested in its development. In 2007/2008 the first version of the REAL SQL Server was released. A new version was released in April 2009 and renamed REAL Server. In September 2010 SQLabs repurchased all the server's Intellectual Properties and a new major release was under development by the SQLabs team. The product is now called cubeSQL.

== Connectivity ==
REAL Server can be used with the following: Realbasic (since renamed xojo), PHP, C SDK, and ODBC.
