= IBM IS1 =

IS/1 was the world's first relational database system, implemented at the IBM United Kingdom Scientific Centre in Peterlee in the years 1970–1972. It had limited facilities but implemented a true relational model. It was the precursor to PRTV.
