= Altibase =

Hybrid database, relational open source database management system

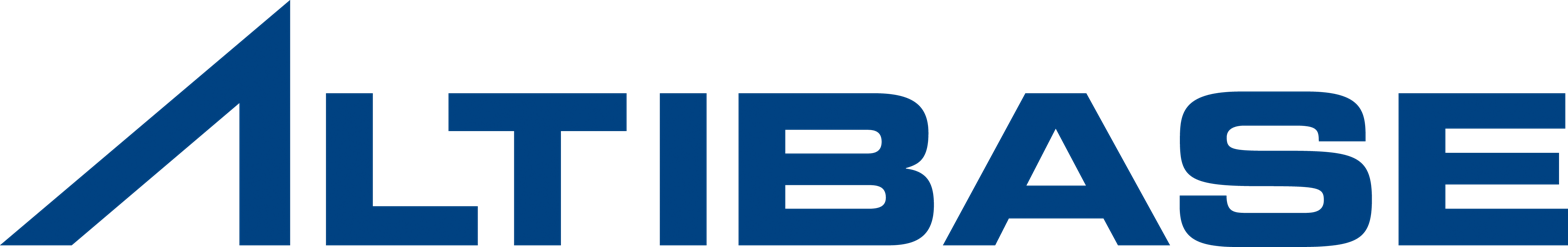
- ALTIBASE | Mission-Critical Succeed
- Developer: Altibase Corporation
- Release: 2000
- Stable release: v7.3, 2023 / August 31, 2023; 3 years ago
- Operating system: AIX, HP-UX, Linux
- Available in: English
- Type: Database Management System, RDBMS
- License: Proprietary
- Website: Altibase
- Repository: github.com/ALTIBASE/

Altibase is a hybrid database, relational database management system manufactured by the Altibase Corporation. The software's hybrid architecture allows it to access both memory-resident and disk-resident tables using single interface. It supports both synchronous and asynchronous replication and offers real-time ACID compliance. Support is also offered for a variety of SQL standards and programming languages. Other important capabilities include data import and export, data encryption for security, multiple data access command sets, materialized view and temporary tables, and others.

== History ==
From 1991 through 1997 the Mr. RT project was an in-memory database research project, conducted by the Electronics and Telecommunications Research Institute a government-funded research organization in South Korea. Altibase was incorporated in 1999.

Altibase acquired an in-memory database engine from the Electronics and Telecommunications Research Institute in February 2000, and commercialized the database in October of the same year. In 2001, Altibase changed the name of the in-memory database product from "Spiner" to "Altibase" in 2001. In 2004, Altibase integrated the in-memory database with a disk-resident database to create a hybrid DBMS, released version 4.0 and renamed it as ALTIBASE HDB. Altibase released version 5.5.1 and 6.1.1 in 2012, version 6.3.1 in November 2013, and 6.5.1 in May 2015. Altibase claims that this is the world's first hybrid DBMS. Altibase released its open source edition version 7.1, however, closed the source in 2023.

In August 2023, Altibase released its cloud-optimized version 7.3.

=== Awards ===
- In 2006, Received the Presidential Award at the Korea Software Awards
- In 2007, Selected as World-Class Product by the Ministry of Commerce, Industry and Energy
- In 2009, Awarded the Outstanding Product Award in China's Telecommunications Industry
- In 2009, Received Outstanding Product Award at the China Billing China 2009 Telecommunication Industry Awards
- In 2010, Commendation from the Minister of Knowledge Economy for Technological Practicalization
- In 2011, Received the Grand Prize at the 10th Software Enterprise Competitiveness Award
- In 2011, Selected as Top 10 Emerging Technologies and received Special Award at the Korea Technology Grand Prize
- In 2012, Awarded for Contributions to Military Manpower Administration
- In 2014~2016, Included in Gartner Magic Quadrant for Operational DBMS
- In 2015, Selected as Outstanding BSS by China Fujian Mobile.
- In 2023, Awarded as the Excellent Research and Development Institution by the Korean Ministry Science and ICT
- In 2023, Won the Global Premium Commercial Software Presidential Award at the 9th Global Commercial Software Grand Exhibition in Korea

=== Release ===
The first version, called Spiner, was released in 2000 for commercial use. It took half of the in-memory DBMS market share in South Korea.

In 2002 the second version was released renamed to Altibase v2.0. By 2003, Altibase v3.0 was released and it entered the Chinese market. Released version 4.0 with hybrid architecture, combining RAM and disk databases, was released in 2004.

In 2005 Altibase began working with Chinese telecommunications providers for billing systems, and some financial companies in Taiwan, China, for home trading systems. The software was certified by the Telecommunications Technology Association. The Ministry of Government Administration and Home Affairs gave it an award in 2006. Offices in China and United States opened in 2009.

In 2011, version 5.5.1 was renamed it to HDB (for "hybrid database"). The Altibase Data Stream product for complex event processing was renamed DSM. The product received a Korean technology award. Altibase introduced certification services. In 2012, HDB Zeta and Extreme were announced, and DSM renamed to CEP.

In 2013, yet another variant called XDB was announced, and the company received ISO/IEC 20000 certification. In 2018, Altibase went open source.

Altibase went open source in February, 2018. Altibase Corp has made the decision to discontinue the Altibase 7.1 open source edition, effective March 17, 2023. As a result, the open-source edition of Altibase 7.1 will no longer be available for download or use. Altibase released version 7.3 in September, 2023, its notable feature is the world’s first hybrid partition, allowing data to be stored in both memory and on disk at the partition level. Version 7.3 also added parallel processing capabilities for high-speed performance in both partitioned and non-partitioned scenarios. Improving potential bottlenecks associated with Commit and logging that impact transaction performance, version 7.3 has achieved an approximately 490% enhancement in performance compared to previous versions.

=== Release history ===
Release	Release date	Latest version	Latest release date
Altibase v3	March 2003; 23 years ago	3.5.7.24	2004-09-03
Altibase v4	April 2005; 21 years ago	4.3.9.236	2017-10-23
Altibase v5.1.X	October 2007; 19 years ago	5.1.5.119	2017-12-06
Altibase v5.3.X	October 2009; 17 years ago	5.3.5.48	2019-08-13
Altibase v5.5.1	February 2011; 15 years ago	5.5.1.8.1	2021-03-19
Altibase v6.1.1	April 2012; 14 years ago	6.1.1.10.5	2023-09-08
Altibase v6.3.1	October 2013; 13 years ago	6.3.1.12.5	2022-08-10
Altibase v6.5.1	June 2015; 11 years ago	6.5.1.10.0	2023-12-11
Altibase v7.1	July 2017; 9 years ago	7.1.1.9.2	2023-12-21
Altibase v7.3	August 2023; 3 years ago	7.3.0.0.3	2023-12-14
Legend: Unsupported Supported Latest version

== Clients ==
According to marketing research, Altibase have over 700 customers and more than 8,000 of installations and deployments, including 22 Fortune Global 500 Companies.

Altibase's clients in the telecommunications, financial services, manufacturing, and utilities sectors include Bloomberg, AT&T, LG, Intel, LGU+, E*TRADE, HP, UAT Inc., POSCO, SK Telecom, KT Corporation, Samsung Electronics, Shinhan Bank, Woori Bank, Canon(Toshiba), Hanhwa, The South Korean Ministry of Defense, G-Market, CJ, and Chung-Ang University.

=== Global clients ===
- Japan
  - FX Prime, a foreign exchange services company
  - Retela Crea Securities
- United States
  - AT&T
    - Implemented Altibase for its PS-LTE Safety network, where the Presence service plays a vital role.
    - This service handles the reception and storage of user information, conducting real-time checks for online presence and location as needed.
- Canada
  - Telus
    - One of the major telecommunication companies.
    - Utilizes Altibase for its operations involving real-time user management, processing high volumes of dedicated terminal data, and managing real-time location information (GIS) for terminals.
    - Altibase contributes to the company's in-house solution for maintaining uninterrupted services during national disasters or similar situations, ensuring efficiency and reliability.
- China
  - China Mobile, China Unicom, China Telecom
    - The three major telecommunications companies.
    - Utilize ALTIBASE HDB in 29 of 31 Chinese provinces.
- Turkish
  - Ziraat Bank, Halk Bank, Deniz Bank, Garanti BBVA, TEB, Oyak Bank, QNB, Burgan Bank, and others.
    - In 2018, Altibase entered the market through a partnership with ATP-Tradesoft, a subsidiary of Ata Holdings. Collaborating with ATP-Tradesoft.
    - Altibase integrated into the Online Trading System XFront.
    - This integration was well-received by major financial institutions and securities firms in Turkey.
    - Altibase is currently implemented in the XFront Online Trading System, used by 13 significant financial institutions and banks in the Turkey.
- Thailand
  - Bualuang Securities
    - Altibase has been supplied its DBMS to support the construction of the online stock trading platform.
- Mongolia
  - MobiCom
    - The Mongolian telecommunication giant, has adopted Altibase’s 7.0 version for its mobile platform for storing the infrequently used data.
- Azerbaijan
  - M1 highway
    - Altibase has been supplied as the Database Management System (DBMS) for the electronic toll collection system.
    - One of the most crucial transportation networks in the country.
- India
  - State-owned Karur Vysya Bank
    - In 2013, Altibase provided its hybrid database solution and was deployed for the online banking system

=== Industries ===
- Telecommunications
  - LGU+
  - SK Telecom
  - KT Corporation
  - AT&T
  - Telus
- Financial services
  - Shinhan Bank
  - Woori Bank
  - KakaoPay Securities
    - Implemented Altibase in its stock trading system
    - Leveraging Altibase's replication feature, along with offline replication through shared disk and adapter functionality, the system ensures a high level of availability and consistency, with a reliability rate of 99.999% even in the event of system failures.
  - COREDAX
    - Cryptocurrency market
    - Altibase has entered into a strategic partnership by signing a database management system (DBMS) supply contract with the cryptocurrency exchange
  - Bloomberg
  - E*TRADE
- Manufacturing
  - Samsung Electronics
  - LG
  - POSCO
  - Hanhwa
  - Canon(Toshiba)
  - Intel
  - HP
- Utilities
  - South Korean Ministry of Defense
  - G-Market
  - CJ
  - UAT Inc.
  - Chung-Ang University

== Features ==
Altibase is a so-called "hybrid DBMS", meaning that it simultaneously supports access to both memory-resident and disk-resident tables via a single interface. It is compatible with Solaris, HP-UX, AIX, Linux, and Windows. It supports the complete SQL standard, features Multiversion concurrency control (MVCC), implements Fuzzy and Ping-Pong Checkpointing for periodically backing up memory-resident data, and ships with Replication and Database Link functionality.

- High performance, large -capacity service
  - Fast real-time data processing and large amounts of data stable
  - Provide parallel processing architecture for large data management
  - Developed and provided Hybrid Partitioned Table function for efficiency according to data personality
- High stability
  - World's first hybrid database development
  - Strict quality management, Release Process Compliance and Stable technical support
- Securing high availability, improving scalability
  - Altibase Replication function provides high-availability and high-performance real-time redundancy function
  - Introducing replication performance by introducing replication compression function, maximizing compression efficiency
  - Provide DR (Disaster Recovery) function for stable backup
  - Altibase Kubernetes Utility (AKU) provides Scale-Out and Scale-In convenience
- Compatibility, development convenience
  - Increasing convenience and productivity by providing a standard development interface perfectly
  - Link support with various MiddleWare and 3rd Party Tool

=== Supported application compatibility ===
- Client development environment
  - ODBC
  - JDBC
  - SQLCLI
  - Embedded SQL (Pre-Compiler)
  - ADO.NET
  - unixODBC
- Server development environment
  - SQL (SQL-92)
  - Built-in function
  - Stored procedure & functions
  - Views
  - Triggers
