= UnixODBC =

Open-source project implementing ODBC API

unixODBC
- Developers: Peter Harvey, Nick Gorham
- Initial release: 1999; 27 years ago
- Stable release: 2.3.14 / 7 October 2025
- Operating system: Cross-platform
- Type: Data Access API
- License: GNU GPL/LGPL
- Website: www.unixODBC.org
- Repository: github.com/lurcher/unixODBC

unixODBC is an open-source project that implements the Open Database Connectivity (ODBC) API. The code is provided under the GNU GPL/LGPL and can be built and used on many different operating systems, including most versions of Unix, Linux, Mac OS X, IBM OS/2 and Microsoft's Interix.

The goals of the project include:

- Provide developers with the tools to port Microsoft Windows ODBC applications to other platforms with the minimum of code changes.
- Maintain the project as a vendor neutral interface database SDK
- Provide people who write ODBC drivers the tools to port their drivers to non Windows platforms
- Provide the user with a set of GUI and command line tools for managing their database access
- Maintain links with both the free software community and commercial database vendors, to ensure interoperability

== History ==
=== 1999 ===
The unixODBC project was first started in the early months of 1999 (by Peter Harvey) and was created as at that time the developers of iODBC (another open source ODBC implementation) were not then willing to LGPL the code, expand the API to include the current ODBC 3 API specification, and did not consider the addition of GUI based configuration tools worthwhile. iODBC now has these parts added, and applications that use the ODBC interface may use both iODBC and unixODBC, without change in most cases, as a result of both projects adhering to the single ODBC specification.

=== 1999 July ===
The original driver manager was very basic. The driver manager was rewritten by Easysoft's Nick Gorham soon after the project started. Nick assumed leadership of the project in July 1999 with Peter Harvey continuing work on supporting code.

The development of unixODBC progressed since its origin, with contributions from many developers, both in the open source community and also from commercial database companies, including IBM, Oracle Corporation and SAP.

It is included as part of the standard installation of many Linux distributions.

=== 2009 ===
The unixODBC project was split into several projects (all hosted on SourceForge);

- unixODBC ("Core" and "Dev" bits)
- unixODBC-GUI-Qt (Qt based GUI bits)
- unixODBC-Test (multiple test frameworks)

This split was done to allow faster releases of supporting work while maintaining focus on stability and consistency for the core code.
