= MonetDB =

Open source column-oriented relational database management system

- Developer: MonetDB Foundation
- Stable release: Dec2025 (11.55) / 16 December 2025; 7 months ago
- Written in: C
- Operating system: Cross-platform
- Type: Column-oriented DBMS; RDBMS
- License: Mozilla Public License, version 2.0
- Website: www.monetdb.org
- Repository: github.com/MonetDB/MonetDB/

MonetDB is an open-source column-oriented relational database management system (RDBMS) originally developed at the Centrum Wiskunde & Informatica (CWI) in the Netherlands. It is designed to provide high performance on complex SQL queries against large databases, such as combining tables with hundreds of columns and billions of rows. MonetDB has been applied in high-performance applications for online analytical processing, data mining, geographic information system (GIS), Resource Description Framework (RDF), text retrieval and sequence alignment processing.

== History ==
Data mining projects in the 1990s required improved analytical database support. This resulted in a CWI spin-off called Data Distilleries, which used early MonetDB implementations in its analytical suite. Data Distilleries eventually became a subsidiary of SPSS in 2003, which in turn was acquired by IBM in 2009.

MonetDB in its current form was first created in 2002 by doctoral student Peter Boncz and professor Martin L. Kersten as part of the 1990s' MAGNUM research project at University of Amsterdam. It was initially called simply Monet, after the French impressionist painter Claude Monet. The first version under an open-source software license (a modified version of the Mozilla Public License) was released on September 30, 2004. When MonetDB version 4 was released into the open-source domain, many extensions to the code base were added by the MonetDB/CWI team, including a new SQL front end, supporting the SQL:2003 standard.

MonetDB introduced innovations in all layers of the DBMS: a storage model based on vertical fragmentation, a modern CPU-tuned query execution architecture that often gave MonetDB a speed advantage over the same algorithm over a typical interpreter-based RDBMS. It was one of the first database systems to tune query optimization for CPU caches. MonetDB includes automatic and self-tuning indexes, run-time query optimization, and a modular software architecture.

By 2008, a follow-on project called X100 (MonetDB/X100) started, which evolved into the VectorWise technology. VectorWise was acquired by Actian Corporation, integrated with the Ingres database and sold as a commercial product.

In 2011 a major effort to renovate the MonetDB codebase was started. As part of it, the code for the MonetDB 4 kernel and its XQuery components were frozen. In MonetDB 5, parts of the SQL layer were pushed into the kernel. The resulting changes created a difference in internal APIs, as it transitioned from MonetDB Instruction Language (MIL) to MonetDB Assembly Language (MAL). Older, no-longer maintained top-level query interfaces were also removed. First was XQuery, which relied on MonetDB 4 and was never ported to version 5. The experimental Jaql interface support was removed with the October 2014 release. With the July 2015 release, MonetDB gained support for read-only data sharding and persistent indices. In this release the deprecated streaming data module DataCell was also removed from the main codebase in an effort to streamline the code. In addition, the license has been changed into the Mozilla Public License, version 2.0.

== Architecture ==
MonetDB architecture is represented in three layers, each with its own set of optimizers. The front end is the top layer, providing query interface for SQL, with SciQL and SPARQL interfaces under development. Queries are parsed into domain-specific representations, like relational algebra for SQL, and optimized. The generated logical execution plans are then translated into MonetDB Assembly Language (MAL) instructions, which are passed to the next layer. The middle or back-end layer provides a number of cost-based optimizers for the MAL. The bottom layer is the database kernel, which provides access to the data stored in Binary Association Tables (BATs). Each BAT is a table consisting of an Object-identifier and value columns, representing a single column in the database.

MonetDB internal data representation also relies on the memory addressing ranges of contemporary CPUs using demand paging of memory mapped files, and thus departing from traditional DBMS designs involving complex management of large data stores in limited memory.

=== Query Recycling ===
Query recycling is an architecture for reusing the byproducts of the operator-at-a-time paradigm in a column store DBMS. Recycling makes use of the generic idea of storing and reusing the results of expensive computations. Unlike low-level instruction caches, query recycling uses an optimizer to pre-select instructions to cache. The technique is designed to improve query response times and throughput, while working in a self-organizing fashion. The authors from the CWI Database Architectures group, composed of Milena Ivanova, Martin Kersten, Niels Nes and Romulo Goncalves, won the "Best Paper Runner Up" at the ACM SIGMOD 2009 conference for their work on Query Recycling.

=== Database Cracking ===
MonetDB was one of the first databases to introduce Database Cracking. Database Cracking is an incremental partial indexing and/or sorting of the data. It directly exploits the columnar nature of MonetDB. Cracking is a technique that shifts the cost of index maintenance from updates to query processing. The query pipeline optimizers are used to massage the query plans to crack and to propagate this information. The technique allows for improved access times and self-organized behavior. Database Cracking received the ACM SIGMOD 2011 J.Gray best dissertation award.

== Components ==
A number of extensions exist for MonetDB that extend the functionality of the database engine. Due to the three-layer architecture, top-level query interfaces can benefit from optimizations done in the backend and kernel layers.

=== SQL ===
MonetDB/SQL is a top-level extension, which provides complete support for transactions in compliance with the SQL:2003 standard.

=== GIS ===
MonetDB/GIS is an extension to MonetDB/SQL with support for the Simple Features Access standard of Open Geospatial Consortium (OGC).

=== SciQL ===
SciQL an SQL-based query language for science applications with arrays as first class citizens. SciQL allows MonetDB to effectively function as an array database. SciQL is used in the European Union PlanetData and TELEIOS project, together with the Data Vault technology, providing transparent access to large scientific data repositories. Data Vaults map the data from the distributed repositories to SciQL arrays, allowing for improved handling of spatio-temporal data in MonetDB. SciQL will be further extended for the Human Brain Project.

=== Data Vaults ===
Data Vault is a database-attached external file repository for MonetDB, similar to the SQL/MED standard. The Data Vault technology allows for transparent integration with distributed/remote file repositories. It is designed for scientific data data exploration and mining, specifically for remote sensing data. There is support for the GeoTIFF (Earth observation), FITS (astronomy), MiniSEED (seismology) and NetCDF formats. The data is stored in the file repository in the original format, and loaded in the database in a lazy fashion, only when needed. The system can also process the data upon ingestion, if the data format requires it. As a result, even very large file repositories can be efficiently analyzed, as only the required data is processed in the database. The data can be accessed through either the MonetDB SQL or SciQL interfaces. The Data Vault technology was used in the European Union's TELEIOS project, which was aimed at building a virtual observatory for Earth observation data. Data Vaults for FITS files have also been used for processing astronomical survey data for The INT Photometric H-Alpha Survey (IPHAS)

==== SAM/BAM ====
MonetDB has a SAM/BAM module for efficient processing of sequence alignment data. Aimed at the bioinformatics research, the module has a SAM/BAM data loader and a set of SQL UDFs for working with DNA data. The module uses the popular SAMtools library.

=== RDF/SPARQL ===
MonetDB/RDF is a SPARQL-based extension for working with linked data, which adds support for RDF and allowing MonetDB to function as a triplestore. Under development for the Linked Open Data 2 project.

=== R integration ===
MonetDB/R module allows for UDFs written in R to be executed in the SQL layer of the system. This is done using the native R support for running embedded in another application, inside the RDBMS in this case. Previously the MonetDB.R connector allowed the using MonetDB data sources and process them in an R session. The newer R integration feature of MonetDB does not require data to be transferred between the RDBMS and the R session, reducing overhead and improving performance. The feature is intended to give users access to functions of the R statistical software for in-line analysis of data stored in the RDBMS. It complements the existing support for C UDFs and is intended to be used for in-database processing.

=== Python integration ===
Similarly to the embedded R UDFs in MonetDB, the database now has support for UDFs written in Python/NumPy. The implementation uses Numpy arrays (themselves Python wrappers for C arrays), as a result there is limited overhead - providing a functional Python integration with speed matching native SQL functions. The Embedded Python functions also support mapped operations, allowing user to execute Python functions in parallel within SQL queries. The practical side of the feature gives users access to Python/NumPy/SciPy libraries, which can provide a large selection of statistical/analytical functions.

=== MonetDB embedded ===
Following the release of an embedded driver for R and R UDFs in MonetDB (MonetDB/R), the authors created an embedded version of MonetDB in R called MonetDBLite, embedded versions for Python and Java followed. They are distributed as embeddable packages, removing the need to manage a database server, required for the previous API integrations. The DBMS runs within the process itself, eliminating socket communication and serialisation overhead - greatly improving efficiency. The idea behind it is to easily embed an SQLite-like package with the performance of an in-memory optimized columnar store.

=== Former extensions ===
A number of former extensions have been deprecated and removed from the stable code base over time. Some notable examples include an XQuery extension removed in MonetDB version 5; a JAQL extension, and a streaming data extension called Data Cell.

== MonetDB Foundation ==
The MonetDB Foundation is the independent non-profit organisation behind MonetDB. The foundation holds the intellectual property (IP) of MonetDB and is dedicated to advance the development and long-term maintenance of MonetDB. The foundation is funded by charitable donations.

== See also ==
- List of relational database management systems
- Comparison of relational database management systems
- Database management system
- Column-oriented DBMS
- Array DBMS

== Bibliography ==
- Boncz, Peter; Manegold, Stefan; Kersten, Martin (1999). Database architecture optimized for the new bottleneck: Memory access. Proceedings of International Conference on Very Large Data Bases. pp. 54–65.
- Schmidt, Albrecht; Kersten, Martin; Windhouwer, Menzo; Waas, Florian (2001). "Efficient Relational Storage and Retrieval of XML Documents". The World Wide Web and Databases. Lecture Notes in Computer Science. Vol. 1997. Springer. pp. 137–150. doi:10.1007/3-540-45271-0_9. ISBN 978-3-540-41826-9.
- Idreos, Stratos; Kersten, Martin L; Manegold, Stefan (2007). Database cracking. Proceedings of CIDR.
- Boncz, Peter A; Kersten, Martin L; Manegold, Stefan (2008). "Breaking the memory wall in MonetDB". Communications of the ACM. 51 (12). ACM: 77–85. doi:10.1145/1409360.1409380. S2CID 5633935.
- Sidirourgos, Lefteris; Goncalves, Romulo; Kersten, Martin; Nes, Niels; Manegold, Stefan (2008). "Column-store support for RDF data management: not all swans are white". Proceedings of the VLDB Endowment. 1 (2): 1553–1563. doi:10.14778/1454159.1454227.
- Ivanova, Milena G.; Kersten, Martin L.; Nes, Niels J.; Goncalves, Romulo A.P. (2009). "An Architecture for Recycling Intermediates in a Column-store". Proceedings of the 2009 ACM SIGMOD International Conference on Management of Data. SIGMOD '09. ACM. pp. 309–320. doi:10.1145/1559845.1559879. ISBN 978-1-60558-551-2.
- Manegold, Stefan; Boncz, Peter A.; Kersten, Martin L. (Dec 2000). "Optimizing Database Architecture for the New Bottleneck: Memory Access". The VLDB Journal. 9 (3). Springer-Verlag New York, Inc.: 231–246. doi:10.1007/s007780000031. ISSN 1066-8888. S2CID 1688757.
- Ivanova, Milena G; Kersten, Martin L; Nes, Niels J; Goncalves, Romulo AP (2010). "An architecture for recycling intermediates in a column-store". ACM Transactions on Database Systems. 35 (4). ACM: 24. doi:10.1145/1862919.1862921. S2CID 52811192.
- Goncalves, Romulo & Kersten, Martin (2011). "The data cyclotron query processing scheme". ACM Transactions on Database Systems. 36 (4). ACM: 27. doi:10.1145/2043652.2043660. S2CID 6707515.
- Kersten, Martin L; Idreos, Stratos; Manegold, Stefan; Liarou, Erietta (2011). "The researcher's guide to the data deluge: Querying a scientific database in just a few seconds". PVLDB Challenges and Visions.
- Kersten, M; Zhang, Ying; Ivanova, Milena; Nes, Niels (2011). "SciQL, a query language for science applications". Proceedings of the EDBT/ICDT 2011 Workshop on Array Databases. ACM. pp. 1–12.
- Sidirourgos, Lefteris; Kersten, Martin; Boncz, Peter (2011). SciBORQ: Scientific data management with Bounds On Runtime and Quality. CIDR 2011: 5th Biennial Conference on Innovative Data Systems Research. Creative Commons.
- Liarou, Erietta; Idreos, Stratos; Manegold, Stefan; Kersten, Martin (2012). "MonetDB/DataCell: online analytics in a streaming column-store". Proceedings of the VLDB Endowment. 5 (12): 1910–1913. doi:10.14778/2367502.2367535. S2CID 545154.
- Ivanova, Milena; Kersten, Martin; Manegold, Stefan (2012). "Data vaults: a symbiosis between database technology and scientific file repositories". Scientific and Statistical Database Management. SSDBM 2012. Springer Berlin Heidelberg. pp. 485–494.
- Kargin, Yagiz; Ivanova, Milena; Zhang, Ying; Manegold, Stefan; Kersten, Martin (August 2013). "Lazy ETL in Action: ETL Technology Dates Scientific Data" (PDF). Proceedings of the VLDB Endowment. 6 (12): 1286–1289. doi:10.14778/2536274.2536297. ISSN 2150-8097.
- Sidirourgos, Lefteris & Kersten, Martin (2013). "Column imprints: a secondary index structure". Proceedings of the 2013 international conference on Management of data. ACM. pp. 893–904.
- Ivanova, Milena; Kargin, Yagiz; Kersten, Martin; Manegold, Stefan; Zhang, Ying; Datcu, Mihai; Molina, Daniela Espinoza (2013). "Data Vaults: A Database Welcome to Scientific File Repositories". Proceedings of the 25th International Conference on Scientific and Statistical Database Management. SSDBM. ACM. doi:10.1145/2484838.2484876. ISBN 978-1-4503-1921-8.
