= Peter Boncz =

Dutch computer scientist

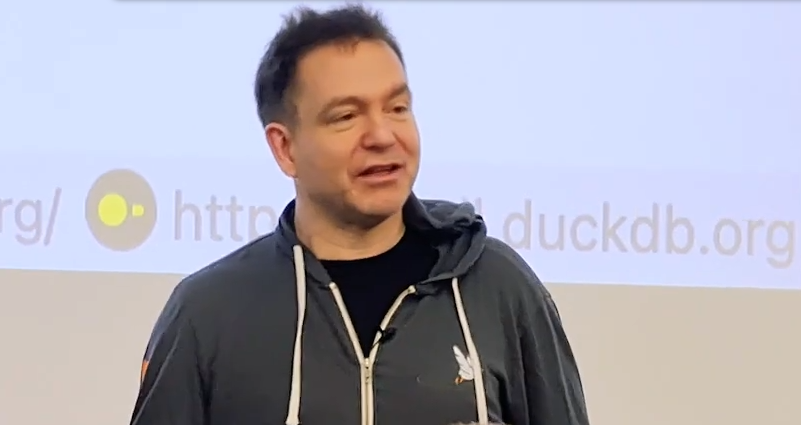
- Boncz at BTW 2025
- Born: Amsterdam
- Citizenship: Dutch
- Education: University of Amsterdam (Ph.D.)
- Known for: MonetDB; VectorWise; MotherDuck
- Awards: 2022 ACM Fellow
- Scientific career
- Fields: Computer Science
- Workplaces: Centrum Wiskunde & Informatica
- Thesis: Monet; a next-Generation DBMS Kernel For Query-Intensive Applications (2002)
- Doctoral advisor: Martin L. Kersten
- Website: homepages.cwi.nl/~boncz/

Peter Boncz is a Dutch computer scientist specializing in database systems. He is a researcher at the Centrum Wiskunde & Informatica and professor at the Vrije Universiteit Amsterdam in the special chair of Large-Scale Analytical Data Management.

He is a pioneer and expert in the area of high performance, analytical database systems. As part of his PhD work, he designed MonetDB, one of the first relational column database systems. MonetDB is widely influential in the design of commercial analytical database systems and in recognition the team received 10-year Best Paper Award at VLDB 2009. In 2004 he started the MonetDB/X100 research project, aiming to significantly improve the performance of MonetDB via vectorized processing. This research project led to a commercial spin-off VectorWise.

Boncz's research in database technologies created multiple spin-off companies. Data Distilleries (1996-2003) focused on developing data mining software and used MonetDB as its backend. Data Distilleries was acquired by SPSS in 2003. MonetDB BV (2008-present) provides consulting and support service for MonetDB users. Vectorwise (2008-2010) commercialized the X100 research project and was acquired by Actian in 2010. As Fellow at the Technical University of Munich he was also involved in the spin-off around the Hyper database system, that is now part of the Tableau analytics tool.

Boncz was named to the 2022 class of ACM Fellows, "for contributions to the design of columnar, main-memory, and vectorized database systems".

In 2019, Boncz' Database Architectures group members Hannes Mühleisen and Mark Raasveldt launched a new Column-oriented DBMS named DuckDB, which incorporates ideas from MonetDB, VectorWise and Hyper. Its performance and ease-of use rapidly gained it popularity, and this spawned the spin-off company DuckDB Labs (2021) that employs the core team, and later MotherDuck (2022). The latter aims at putting DuckDB in the cloud using the concept of "hybrid query processing" in which both client and server contain a DuckDB processor. Boncz spent his 2023-2024 sabbatical at MotherDuck.
