= Versant Corporation =

American-based software company

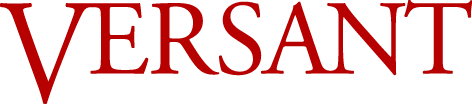
- Traded as: Nasdaq: VSNT
- Industry: Software; Database management
- Founded: 1988
- Defunct: 2012
- Fate: Acquired by Actian (2012; 14 years ago)
- Headquarters: Redwood City, California, USA
- Products: Object Database
- Revenue: ▲25,3 million USD (2008)
- Website: www.versant.com

Versant Corporation was an American-based software company building specialized NoSQL data management systems. Versant was founded in Menlo Park, California (USA) in 1988. It was headquartered in Redwood City, California.

It was noted in 2005 that the market share for object oriented databases held by Versant was "very small" compared to IBM and Oracle. However, two years earlier, Versant ODBMS and IBM UniData were mentioned side-by-side as "two of the most recent examples of object-oriented database software" in a bestselling database design text.

== History ==
The company was founded by Dr. Kee Ong in August 1988 as "Object Sciences Corporation". Ong previously worked with the open-source relational database management system Ingres. Around this time object-oriented programming (OO) became popular, and the company used research done at the University of Wisconsin for a commercial database system to complement OO languages. The company's initial executive team included Michael Seashols (CEO), Dr. Kee Ong (CTO), John Hughes (VP, Sales), Dr. Mary Loomis (VP, Services) and Susan Dickerson (VP, Business Development).

In early 1990 the company was renamed “Versant Object Technology.” In April 1993 David Banks took over as CEO. On July 18, 1996 Versant had their initial public offering (IPO) on the NASDAQ stock exchange and traded under the symbol VSNT. The company raised $14.9 million from the IPO, and was based in Menlo Park, California at the time, but moved to Fremont, California in 1997. In January 1998 Nick Ordon succeeded Banks as CEO. on July 15, 1998 the company was renamed again to Versant Corporation.

In the 1990s, Versant went through a period where most of their R&D costs were spent on "maintaining and upgrading existing product releases" across a large number of operating systems and hardware. According to a former VP of engineering, outsourcing this maintenance grind of R&D maintenance to India was the main action that allowed the company to survive the decade.

In March 2004, Versant acquired Poet Software GmbH, a European-focused company targeting the Windows product market which had traded on the Frankfurt Stock Exchange. In 2005, Jochen Witte, president of Poet Software, took over as CEO of Versant Corporation. In August 2005, the common stock had a 1-for-10 reverse stock split. On December 1, 2008 Versant acquired the assets of the database software business of Servo Software, Inc. (formerly named db4objects, Inc.). It developed the open source embedded database technology db4o.

In late 2012, after rejecting an offer by UNICOM Systems Inc., Versant Corporation announced it was being acquired by Actian Corporation, the commercial developer of Ingres and Vectorwise. The acquisition was promoted using the marketing term big data. It closed in December for an estimated $37 million.

== Products ==
- Versant JPA (now NoSQL JPA) is a JPA 2.0 compliant interface for its object database that includes a technical preview of an analytics platform including Hadoop support. It is available as a server and SDK for use with Windows and Linux operating systems.
- Versant FastObjects (now NoSQL FastObjects) is a developer-friendly, object-oriented alternative to a relational database for .NET persistence.
- db4o was an embeddable open-source object database for Java and .NET. db4o was coded in Java and translated to C# by an open-source tool called Sharpen. It was discontinued by Actian in 2014.

Features comparison
	NoSQL Database	NoSQL JPA	NoSQL Fast Objects
C/C++	Yes	No	Yes
Java	No	Yes	Yes
.NET	No	No	Yes
Enterprise scalability	Yes	Yes	No
Embeddable	No	No	Yes
Minimal administration – no specialized DBA required	Yes	Yes	Yes
Dual client/server caching architecture – improve performance by balancing resources	Yes	Yes	Yes
Multicore scalability – get the most value from your hardware	Yes	Yes	No
No mapping code required – focus on the business problem	Yes	Yes	Yes
Online schema evolution – update your application without downtime	Yes	Yes	Yes

The company also developed a product called "enJin", an infrastructure platform to work with other systems as a "transaction accelerator" by supporting decoupling between J2EE applications and data stores which worked as a type of middleware object cache. IBM suggested the use of Versant enJin as an accelerator in the context of IBM WebSphere applications, which themselves were middleware applications.
