= Fuzzy Logix =

U.S.-based analytics solutions company

- Industry: IT/Software/Hardware/Predictive Analytics/In-Database/GPU Analytics
- Founded: 2007
- Founder: Partha Sen, Mike Upchurch
- Headquarters: Charlotte, NC, USA
- Products: High Performance Analytics for Big Data (DB Lytix and FIN Lytix) Analytics Accelerators (Saral and AdapteR) Analytics Consultancy and Services Index Management Platform (FastINDX)

Fuzzy Logix is a company that develops analytics solutions for operating on large amounts of data.

The company was started in Charlotte, NC, USA, where their headquarters are located today. Fuzzy Logix has offices in Richmond, VA, Cupertino, CA and in the UK and India and has reseller partners in Mexico, Sweden, Japan and China. Now Fuzzy Logix conducts business through AarkAI LLC.

Fuzzy Logix offers in-database and GPU-based analytics solutions.

== History ==
Fuzzy Logix was formed in 2007 by Partha Sen and Mike Upchurch who met while working at Bank of America and shared a goal of making analytics pervasive. Kaushal Misra and Aashu Virmani joined in 2015, both from IIT Roorkee (same as Partha Sen).

In 2008 Fuzzy Logix released DB Lytix, a library of in-database analytics. FIN Lytix was released in 2010 and was the first comprehensive library of in-database financial models. In 2010, Aperity OEM’d Fuzzy Logix models to run in their analytics and CPG software SaaS solutions.

In 2011, Quest (now Dell) released Toad for Data Analyst (Data Point) that included Fuzzy Logix's models running in MySQL.

== Software ==
Fuzzy Logix offers four software products DB Lytix and Fin Lytix are comprehensive libraries of in-database analytic models. The libraries leverage the user defined function (UDF) capability available in database platforms. The software is available on multiple database platforms.

=== DB Lytix ===
Fuzzy Logix released DB Lytix in 2008. The library had been under development since 1998. The library includes mathematical, statistical, data mining, simulation and classification models.

=== Fin Lytix ===
Fuzzy Logix released FIN Lytix, a financial library, in 2010. The library contains models for equity, fixed income, foreign exchange, interest rate and time series models.

== Supported Database Platforms ==
Aster Data, Informix, Netezza, IBM PureData Systems, MySQL, ParAccel, SQL Server, Sybase IQ and Teradata.
