= DuckDB =

Open source column-oriented RDBMS

- Developer: DuckLabs
- Stable release: v2.0.1 / November 20, 2026; 0 days ago
- Written in: C++
- Operating system: Cross-platform
- Type: Column-oriented DBMS; RDBMS
- License: MIT License
- Website: duckdb.org
- Repository: github.com/duckdb

DuckDB is an open-source column-oriented relational database management system (RDBMS). It is designed to provide high performance on complex queries against large databases in embedded configuration, such as combining tables with hundreds of columns and billions of rows. Unlike other embedded databases (for example, SQLite) DuckDB is not focused on transactional (OLTP) applications and instead is specialized for online analytical processing (OLAP) workloads. The project has over 6 million downloads per month.

== History ==
DuckDB was originally developed by Mark Raasveldt and Hannes Mühleisen at the Centrum Wiskunde & Informatica (CWI) in the Netherlands. The project co-founders designed DuckDB to address the need for an in-process OLAP database solution. DuckDB was first released in 2019. DuckDB version 1.0.0 was released on June 3, 2024, under the codename SnowDuck.

Version	Codename	Release date	Key features
1.0.0	SnowDuck	June 3, 2024	First stable production release; backward-compatible storage format guaranteed
1.1.0	Eatoni	September 9, 2024	Parallel streaming of query results; improved foreign key index performance
1.2.0	Histrionicus	February 2025	CSV reader rewrite; new C API for extensions; CLI autocomplete
1.3.0	Ossivalis	May 2025	HyperLogLog adaptive hash table sizing; Parquet reader/writer rewrite
1.4.0	Andium	September 2025	LTS release; AES-256 encryption; MERGE INTO; official Docker images
1.5.0	Variegata	March 9, 2026	Built-in GEOMETRY type; VARIANT type; new CLI; Azure write support; DuckLake v0.4
1.5.1	—	March 23, 2026	Bug fixes: CLI non-interactive shell, ART index, Iceberg v3, S3 globbing

== Features ==
DuckDB uses a vectorized query processing engine. DuckDB is special amongst database management systems because it does not have any external dependencies and can be built with just a C++17 compiler. DuckDB also deviates from the traditional client–server model by running inside a host process (it has bindings, for example, for a Python interpreter with the ability to directly place data into NumPy arrays). DuckDB's SQL parser is derived from the pg_query library developed by Lukas Fittl, which is itself derived from a stripped-down version of PostgreSQL's SQL parser. DuckDB uses a single-file storage format to store data on disk, designed to support efficient scans, bulk updates, appends, and deletes. DuckDB is also compiled to WebAssembly using emscripten which enables DuckDB to run SQL in browser-based analytics tools.

== Comparison ==
DuckDB in its OLAP niche does not compete with the traditional DBMS like MSSQL, PostgreSQL and Oracle database. While using SQL for queries, DuckDB targets serverless applications and provides extremely fast responses using either Apache Parquet files or its own format for storage. These attributes make it a popular choice for large dataset analysis in interactive mode.

== Commercial use ==
DuckDB is used at Facebook, Google, and Airbnb.

DuckDB co-author Mühleisen also runs a support and consultancy firm for the software, DuckLabs. The company has chosen not to take venture capital funding, stating "We feel investment would force the project direction towards monetization, and we would much prefer keeping DuckDB open and available for as many people as possible". Another company, MotherDuck, has received $100 million funding for its data platform based on DuckDB, with investors including Andreessen Horowitz.

The company DuckLabs was formerly known as DuckDB Labs. In August 2026, DuckLabs was acquired by Amazon; its employees will join the Amazon Web Services subsidiary.

== DuckDB Foundation ==
The independent non-profit DuckDB Foundation safeguards the long-term maintenance and development of DuckDB. The foundation holds much of the intellectual property of the project and is funded by charitable donations. The DuckDB Foundation's statutes ensure DuckDB remains open-source under the MIT license in perpetuity.

== Language support ==
In addition to the native C and C++ APIs, DuckDB supports a range of programming languages.

Client APIs
Language	Notes	Reference
Java	The Java API is implemented using JNI. Integration with the Apache Arrow format is provided.	
Python	The Python API implements support for the Pandas, Apache Arrow and Polars data analysis packages.	
Rust	The Rust API is distributed as a rust crate that exposes an elegant wrapper over the native C API.	
Node.JS	Node API	
R	R API	
Julia	Julia API	
Swift	Swift API	
WebAssembly	WASM API	
Go	Go API	

== Extensions ==
DuckDB's architecture supports extensions, allowing additional functionality to be added dynamically. Many popular extensions are maintained by the core DuckDB team, and there are over 30 community extensions maintained by third parties.

DuckDB's architecture supports dynamically loaded extensions. Core extensions maintained by the DuckDB team include:

- httpfs — remote file access via HTTP, HTTPS, and S3-compatible object storage (including Azure write support since v1.5)
- spatial — geospatial functions (ST_* family); GEOMETRY became a built-in core type in v1.5
- iceberg — Apache Iceberg table read/write, including REST catalog support
- delta — Delta Lake table read/write via the Delta Kernel
- ducklake — lakehouse format storing all metadata in a SQL database with ACID semantics; supports time travel, schema evolution, and multi-table transactions

There are also over 30 community extensions maintained by third parties, covering use cases from graph queries (SQL/PGQ) to Kafka integration and ML inference. A full list is available at the DuckDB Community Extensions registry.
