= Actian NoSQL Object Database =

Database management system

NoSQL Object Database
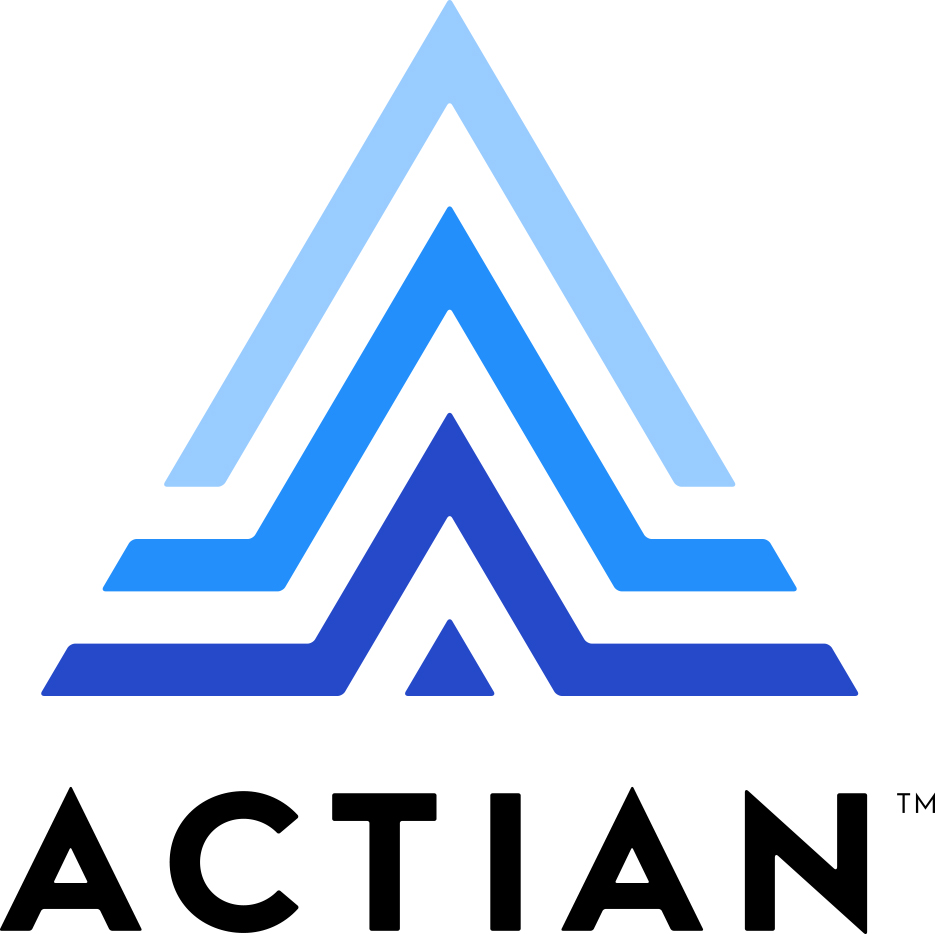
- Developer: Actian
- Stable release: 11 / June 1, 2025
- Written in: Java, C, C#, C++, Smalltalk, Python
- Operating system: Cross-platform Solaris, Linux, Windows (NT thru Vista), AIX, HP-UX (both 32 and 64 bit for all platforms)
- Type: Object Database
- License: All rights reserved
- Website: www.actian.com/data-management/nosql-object-database/

Actian NoSQL Database (formerly known as Versant Object Database or VOD) is an object database software product initially developed by Versant Corporation and currently owned by Actian.

The Actian NoSQL Database enables developers using object oriented languages to transactionally store their information by allowing the respective language to act as the Data Definition Language (DDL) for the database. In other words, the memory model is the database schema model.

In general, persistence in Actian NoSQL is implemented by declaring a list of classes, then providing a transaction demarcation application programming interface to use cases. Respective language integrations adhere to the constructs of that language, including syntactic and directive sugars.

Additional APIs exist, beyond simple transaction demarcation, providing for the more advanced capabilities necessary to address practical issues found when dealing with performance optimization and scalability for systems with large amounts of data, many concurrent users, network latency, disk bottlenecks, etc.
