= IBM System R =

Relational database management system, first implementation of SQL

IBM System R is a database system built as a research project at IBM's San Jose Research Laboratory beginning in 1974, led by Edgar Codd, to implement his ideas on relational databases. System R was a seminal project as the first implementation of SQL, which has since become the standard relational data query language. It was also the first system to demonstrate that a relational database could provide good transaction processing performance. Design decisions in System R, as well as some fundamental algorithm choices (such as the dynamic programming algorithm used in query optimization), influenced many later relational systems.

System R's first customer was Pratt & Whitney in 1977. Not running on Unix hurt its popularity.

== See also ==
- IBM Db2
- IBM SQL/DS
- Ingres (database)
- SQL
- System/38
