= Martin L. Kersten =

Dutch computer scientist (1953-2022)

Sir Martin Kersten
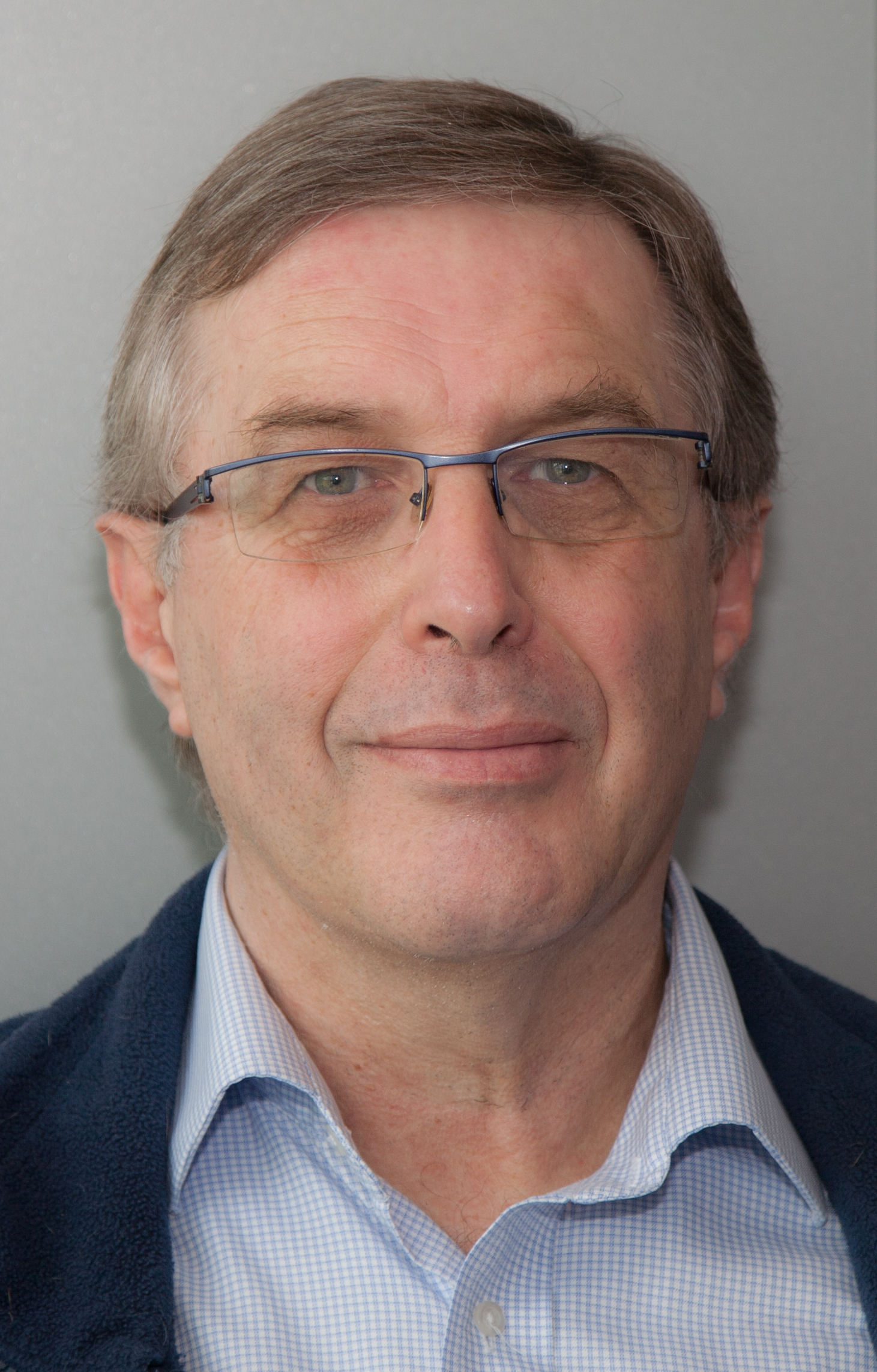
- Born: Martin Leopold Kersten; October 25, 1953; Amsterdam, Netherlands
- Died: July 6, 2022 (aged 68)
- Education: Vrije Universiteit Amsterdam
- Known for: MonetDB
- Awards: Order of the Netherlands Lion, HiPEAC Tech Transfer Award, ACM Fellow, SIGMOD Systems Award, ACM SIGMOD Edgar F. Codd Innovations Award
- Scientific career
- Fields: Computer science
- Workplaces: Vrije Universiteit Amsterdam, University of Amsterdam, Centrum Wiskunde & Informatica
- Website: www.cwi.nl/people/321

Martin L. Kersten (October 25, 1953 – July 6, 2022) was a computer scientist with research focus on database architectures, query optimization and their use in scientific databases. He was an architect of the MonetDB system, an open-source column store for data warehouses, online analytical processing (OLAP) and geographic information systems (GIS). He has been (co-) founder of several successful spin-offs of the Centrum Wiskunde & Informatica (CWI).

== Biography ==
He started his career in computer science as research assistant in 1975. As of 1979 he was scientific researcher and lecturer at the Vrije Universiteit, Amsterdam. Until 1985 he worked on database security, database programming languages and he developed a relational DBMS, which became a component of a commercial CASE environment from 1985 to 1991. He was visiting researcher at the University of California, San Francisco (1980 and 1983), visiting researcher Stanford University (2001 and 2002), and Microsoft Research (2005).

In 1985 he moved to Centrum Wiskunde & Informatica (CWI), the national research institute for mathematics and computer science in the Netherlands, to establish the Database Research Group. Between 1986 and 1990, he was co-designer of the PRISMA database machine, an RDBMS for a 100-node multiprocessor. In a follow-up ESPRIT-II project Kersten was responsible for the development of an enhanced version of SQL for documents and geographical data. From 1989 to 1993, he led a national project on the exploitation of the Amoeba distributed system for advanced database management and a national project for database design formalizations.

Data mining projects in the 1990s required better analytical database support. This resulted in a CWI the spin-off called Data Distilleries, which used early MonetDB implementations in its analytical suite. Data Distilleries eventually became a subsidiary of SPSS in 2003, which in turn was acquired by IBM in 2009.

In April 1992 he became the head of the department of Information Systems. At the same time he started the ESPRIT-III Pythagoras project aimed at performance quality assessment of advanced database systems. He remained associate professor at the Vrije Universiteit, teaching advanced courses on database technology until mid-1994. In 1992 he became an associated professor at the University of Amsterdam and a full professor in multimedia databases in January 1994.

Between 1997 and 2010, Kersten served as head of the Database Architectures research group at the CWI Amsterdam. Since 2011 Kersten was a research fellow at the CWI.

Kersten was an active reviewer for European Strategic Program on Research in Information Technology (ESPRIT) projects and scientific publications. Moreover, he was a trustee of the VLDB Endowment board, which aims to promote and exchange scholarly work in databases and related fields worldwide. Since 2007 Kersten was also editorial board member of "PVLDB" and he served on the editorial board of ACM Transactions on Database Systems journal in 2010.

In 2017 he became a Fellow of the Association for Computing Machinery.

In 2020 he became Knight of the Order of the Netherlands Lion.

== Publications ==
Martin Kersten has published more than 150 publications. In 2009, a team of researchers from the CWI Database Architectures group, composed of Milena Ivanova, Martin Kersten, Niels Nes and Romulo Goncalves, won the "Best Paper Runner Up" at annual ACM SIGMOD conference for their work for on "An Architecture for Recycling Intermediates in a Column-store". In August of the same year, Peter Boncz, Stefan Manegold and Martin Kersten received the VLDB 10-year Best Paper Award for their publication titled "Database Architecture Optimized for the New Bottleneck: Memory Access".

In 2011, Martin Kersten received the VLDB Challenges & Visions Track Best Paper Award for the paper "The Researcher's Guide to the Data Deluge: Querying a Scientific Database in just a Few Seconds", co-authored with his CWI colleagues Stefan Manegold, Stratos Idreos and Erietta Liarou.

On June 26, 2014, at the annual ACM SIGMOD/PODS Conference, Kersten received the ACM SIGMOD Edgar F. Codd Innovations Award for innovative and significant contributions to database systems and databases. Two years later, May 26, 2016, at the annual ACM SIGMOD/PODS Conference, Kersten received the SIGMOD Systems Award for the design and implementation of MonetDB, a pioneering main-memory database system based on a columnar data organization. In the same year, December 8, 2016, Kersten became ACM Fellow.

Other publications include:

- 1992: PRISMA/DB: a parallel, main memory relational DBMS
- 1999: Database architecture optimized for the new bottleneck: Memory access
- 2001: Efficient relational storage and retrieval of XML documents
- 2002: XMark: A benchmark for XML data management
- 2007: Database Cracking
- 2008: Breaking the memory wall in MonetDB
- 2008: Column-store support for RDF data management: not all swans are white
- 2009: An Architecture for Recycling Intermediates in a Column-Store
- 2009: Database Architecture Optimized for the New Bottleneck: Memory Access
- 2010: An architecture for recycling intermediates in a column-store
- 2011: The Data Cyclotron Query Processing Scheme
- 2011: The Researcher's Guide to the Data Deluge: Querying a Scientific Database in just a Few Seconds
- 2011: SciQL, a query language for science applications
- 2011: SciBORQ: Scientific data management with Bounds On Runtime and Quality
- 2012: MonetDB/DataCell: online analytics in a streaming column-store
- 2012: Data vaults: a symbiosis between database technology and scientific file repositories
- 2013: Column imprints: a secondary index structure

== MonetDB ==
MonetDB is a high-performance column-store relational database management system with automatic index management, flexible optimizer infrastructure, and programmable backend functionality. MonetDB (initially only called Monet) was first created by 2002 doctoral student Peter Boncz and professor Martin Kersten as part of the 1990s MAGNUM research project at University of Amsterdam. The first version under an open-source software license (a modified version of the Mozilla Public License) was released on September 30, 2004.

MonetDB introduced innovations at all database management system layers: a storage model based on vertical fragmentation, a modern CPU-tuned query execution architecture that often gave MonetDB a speed advantage on the same algorithm over a typical interpreter-based RDBMS. MonetDB is one of the first database systems to focus its query optimization effort on exploiting CPU caches. MonetDB also features automatic and self-tuning indexes, run-time query optimization, and a modular software architecture.

In 2013 Martin Kersten, together with Ying Zhang, Niels Nes and Sjoerd Mullender established a database services CWI spin-off company.

== See also ==
- MonetDB
- Column-oriented DBMS
