= MotherDuck =

Cloud analytics platform

- Developer: MotherDuck
- Website: motherduck.com

MotherDuck is a serverless cloud analytics platform developed by MotherDuck and built on the open-source DuckDB database system.

== Features ==
MotherDuck is a cloud data warehouse built on the open-source DuckDB query engine. Queries are run using a "hybrid" combination of local and remote computing. Remote queries are run on dedicated per-user serverless compute instances called "Ducklings", which can be sized independently. It also allows users to write queries using generative AI.

== History ==
=== Founding and Early Development ===
MotherDuck was founded in 2022. The company operated in stealth mode until November 2022, when it announced $47.5 million in combined seed and Series A funding.

=== Product Development ===
The company launched its platform in private preview in June 2023. General availability was announced in June 2024. As part of the announcement, MotherDuck employees held a mock protest dressed in duck costumes in front of Moscone Center in San Francisco.
