= Actian =

American software company

- Type: Subsidiary
- Industry: Database management systems; Software; Big data analytics; Cloud data warehouse; Edge data management; Enterprise data integration
- Founded: 1980; 46 years ago
- Headquarters: Santa Clara, California
- Products: Actian Data Platform; Vector; Ingres; OpenROAD; Zen (PSQL); NoSQL (Versant); HCL Informix; DataConnect; DataFlow; Business Xchange; Actian Data Intelligence Platform (formerly Zeenea)
- Parent: HCLSoftware
- Website: www.actian.com

Actian is an American software company headquartered in Santa Clara, California and the data and AI division of HCLSoftware. Actian develops technologies for data intelligence, data observability, databases, conversational AI, and data management, enabling organizations to connect, manage, govern, and analyze data across hybrid and multi-cloud environments. Founded in 1980, Actian is known for its enterprise data intelligence and AI solutions. The company's software supports data discovery, metadata management, and federated governance, allowing enterprises to achieve ROI from data and AI. Actian became part of HCLSoftware in 2018 and continues to operate under its brand within HCLTech's software business. Its products are used by Fortune 100 companies and other global enterprises, serving more than 42 million users worldwide.

== Timeline ==
- 1980: Relational Technology, Inc. was founded to commercialize Ingres (developed at UC Berkeley).
- 1988: RTI went public, raising $28 million on their IPO.
- 1989: Changed name to Ingres Corporation.
- 1990: ASK Computer Systems acquires Ingres Corporation.
- 1994: Computer Associates (CA) acquires the ASK Group.
- 2005: Ingres Corporation spun out of CA, with private equity firm Garnett & Helfrich Capital as largest shareholder.
- 2010: Ingres acquires VectorWise.
- 2011: Changed name to Actian.
- 2012: Actian acquires Versant Corporation.
- 2013: Actian acquires Pervasive Software and ParAccel.
- 2018: Actian was acquired by HCL Technologies and Sumeru Equity Partners for $330 million.
- 2021: HCL Technologies became the sole owner of Actian.
- 2024: Actian acquires Zeenea
- 2026: Actian acquires Wobby.ai
- 2026: Actian launches VectorAI DB
- 2026: Actian adds Jaspersoft.com

== History ==
=== Ingres ===
Ingres was developed at the University of California, Berkeley and commercialized by Relational Technology Inc. After a course of name changes and acquisitions, including VectorWise BV, Versant, Pervasive, and ParAccel, Actian came into existence as a multinational software firm.

Relational Technology, Incorporated (RTI), was founded in 1980 by Michael Stonebraker and Eugene Wong, and professor Lawrence A. Rowe to commercialize Ingres. In the late 1980s, RTI had competition in the database management system (DBMS) market, including Oracle Corporation (which had started with the similar name Relational Software Incorporated), Informix Corporation, and Sybase, but was one of the largest DBMS companies. RTI was renamed Ingres Corporation late in 1989.

ASK Computer Systems announced in September 1990 a deal in which ASK would acquire Ingres, funded partially by investments from Hewlett-Packard and Electronic Data Systems. The deal met resistance from a shareholder, but did complete by November 1990.

=== Relation to Computer Associates ===
Computer Associates (CA) acquired the ASK Group in 1994. Despite a loyal customer base, CA failed to develop the technology much further.

Ingres Corporation was spun out of CA as a separate private company in November 2005, with private equity firm Garnett & Helfrich Capital as largest shareholder. Terry Garnett served as interim chief executive, and CA retained a 25% interest. In July 2006, Roger Burkhardt became president. He promoted open source software, and helped form Open Source for America in 2009.

Ingres announced they had acquired the VectorWise technology in 2010, which had spun out from the Centrum Wiskunde & Informatica (CWI, the Dutch National Research Institute for Mathematics and Computer Science) in 2008. In November 2010, Garnett & Helfrich Capital acquired the last 20% of equity in Ingres Corporation that it did not already own. In July 2011, Steve Shine became chief executive officer.

=== Actian ===
In September 2011, Ingres changed its name to Actian, using the marketing phrase "action apps". CEO Steve Shine said the new focus would be on lower-cost sales for its cloud action platform.

In February 2014, Forbes.com listed Actian at #5 in its "Top 10 Big Data Pure-Plays 2014" citing $138 million in Actian revenue for 2013.

In August, 2016, it was reported that Actian had phased out its products promoted for big data, including the former ParAccel, VectorWise, and DataFlow technology. On November 1, 2016, Shine was replaced as chief executive by Rohit De Souza. A new chief financial officer and executive chairman were also appointed.

In April, 2017, several products were renamed, including the combination of Ingres and the former Vector product into one product, Actian X, with new features.

Actian released a product called Avalanche in March 2019 for use on the Amazon Web Services (AWS) cloud. In November 2023, Actian rebranded and relaunched Avalanche as Actian Data Platform, including new capabilities for Data Quality.

Lewis Black (previously chief financial officer) took over as CEO in 2020. In January 2023, Marc Potter was named CEO, after serving as Chief Revenue and Operations Officer since 2019.

== Acquisitions ==
=== VectorWise B.V. ===
Vectorwise originated from the X100 research project carried out within the Centrum Wiskunde & Informatica (CWI, the Dutch National Research Institute for Mathematics and Computer Science) between 2003 and 2008. It was spun off as a start-up company in 2008, and acquired by Ingres Corporation in 2011. It was released as a commercial product in June, 2010, initially for 64-bit Linux platform, and later also for Windows.

=== Versant Corporation ===
Versant Corporation was an American-based software company building specialized NoSQL data management systems. In late 2012, after rejecting an offer by Unicom Systems, Versant announced it agreed to be acquired by Actian, promoted using the term big data. It closed in December 2012 for an estimated $37 million.

=== ParAccel, Inc. ===
ParAccel was a California-based software company that developed a database management system designed to provide advanced analytics for business intelligence. It was acquired by Actian in April 2013. Analysts expected Actian to market ParAccel for larger databases, and VectorWise for moderately sized applications.

=== Pervasive Software ===
Pervasive Software was a company that developed software including database management systems and extract, transform and load tools. Pervasive PSQL relational database management system was its primary data storage product.

In December 2003 Pervasive acquired Data Junction Corporation, a privately held company with headquarters also in Austin which produced data and application integration tools renamed Pervasive Data Integrator and later DataConnect, for about US$51.7 million in cash and stock.

In 2013, Pervasive Software was acquired by Actian Corporation for $161.9 million, increased from an initial offer of $154 million.

=== Zeenea ===
In August 2024, HCLSoftware announced its intent to acquire the French metadata management platform startup Zeenea for €24 million. The acquisition was completed on September 12, 2024, with Zeenea becoming part of Actian's product portfolio.

== Products and services ==
=== Actian Data Intelligence Platform (Formerly Zeenea) ===
The Actian Data Intelligence Platform, formerly Zeenea, is designed to simplify data discovery and governance within enterprises, offering two key interfaces:

- Actian Studio: Tailored for data stewards and managers, focusing on data cataloging, governance, and metadata management.
- Actian Explorer: User-friendly search tool aimed at business users, enabling easy data asset discovery.

=== Actian Data Observability ===
Actian Data Observability is an enterprise data observability platform used to monitor data quality across data stacks. It uses automated processes for data quality assessment. The platform identifies data quality issues within data infrastructure.

=== Actian Analytics AI Platform (Formerly Actian Data Platform) ===
The Actian Data Platform, formerly called Actian Data Platform and Avalanche, is a fully managed Cloud Data Platform for high performance operational analytics available on Google Cloud Platform, Microsoft Azure and AWS.

It offers a fully managed hybrid cloud data warehouse service designed from the ground up to deliver high performance at scale on commodity infrastructure (running on Kubernetes), using Vector as the core database engine (a vectorized, MPP, fully ANSI SQL compliant RDBMS). It also offers native data integration and data quality capabilities, based on an integrated cloud version of Actian DataConnect, and basic data visualization capabilities.

It is marketed as a zero-DBA, Cloud Data Service that can be directly used by business analyst, data engineers, data scientists, or power-users to pull hundreds of terabytes of disparate and diverse data into a single cloud data warehouse, run sub-second queries and advanced analytics and then visualize and report.

=== Actian Analytics Engine (Formerly Vector) ===
Actian Analytics Engine (formerly known as Vector, Vectorwise or VectorWise) is a SQL relational database management system designed for high performance in analytical database applications.

Starting from 3.5 release in April 2014, the product name was shortened to "Vector". In June 2014, Actian Vortex was announced - clustered MPP version of Vector, working in Hadoop with storage in HDFS. Actian Vortex was later renamed to Actian Vector in Hadoop. In turn, Actian Vector became the core engine in Actian Avalanche.

In 2026, Action Vector was renamed to Actian Analytics Engine beginning with version 8.0.

=== Ingres ===
Ingres is a proprietary SQL relational database management system intended to support large commercial and government applications.

On April 18, 2017, Actian X was introduced as the first natively integrated hybrid database, unifying transactional and analytic processing within a single platform. It integrates features from Ingres and Vector, such as column-based storage, vectorized processing, and multi-core parallelism, supporting diverse workloads for efficient and scalable data management.

In 2024, Actian withdraw the Actian X brand, making all its features and capabilities available to the Ingres 12.0 release.

=== OpenROAD ===
OpenROAD, which stands for "Open Rapid Object Application Development", is a fourth-generation programming language (4GL) and development suite. It includes a suite of development tools, with a built-in IDE (Written in OpenROAD), and Code Repository.

OpenROAD enables the development and deployment of mission-critical, n-tier business applications on Windows and Linux. It connects to databases such as Ingres, Microsoft SQL Server, Oracle, and Zen, and supports additional databases using ODBC.

=== DataConnect ===
Actian DataConnect (originally Data Junction), is a versatile data integration platform that enables companies to connect, transform, and manage data across multiple systems and applications.

It supports real-time synchronization, complex transformations, and comprehensive API connectivity, making it ideal for complex enterprise workflows. DataConnect 12.2 was released in August 2023, introducing improved support for Data Quality metrics generation.

=== DataFlow ===
Actian DataFlow (originally developed as Pervasive DataRush in the early 2000s) is a high-performance, parallel data processing engine optimized for ETL, data transformation, and analytics. It efficiently manages large datasets with multi-core processing, making it ideal for both individual machines and clusters.

It leverages a Directed Acyclic Graph (DAG) engine with a Java API and no dependency to MapReduce, thus avoiding its pitfalls, while enabling efficient parallel processing and reducing memory usage. It integrates with Hadoop environments and supports analytics at scale, making it a powerful tool for enterprise data operations.

Through a partnership with KNIME, DataFlow improved data science workflows by enabling integration with KNIME's analytics platform.

Notably, Actian DataFlow is fully independent of Google Cloud Dataflow, built as a proprietary Actian solution unrelated to Apache Beam.

=== Business Xchange ===
Actian Business Xchange is a managed B2B integration-as-a-service platform that enables trading partners to exchange electronic procurement and supply chain documents regardless of format or enterprise system.

=== Zen (PSQL) ===
Actian Zen (PSQL) (formerly Btrieve, later named Pervasive PSQL until version 13) is an ACID-compliant, Zero-DBA, Embedded, Nano-footprint, Multi-Model, Multi-Platform database management system (DBMS).

=== Actian NoSQL (Versant) ===
Actian NoSQL (formerly known as Versant Object Database or VOD) is a high-performance, object database, focused on complex data management with real-time processing capabilities, particularly suited for highly complex object-oriented applications, embedded applications and analytical use cases.

=== HCL Informix ===
After its acquisition by HCL in 2021, Actian received access to the HCL Informix product line, which is a result of an agreement signed between HCL and IBM in 2017. HCL Informix is a multi-model database management system, with a modular architecture, enabling it be used for enterprise applications or embedded solutions. It is offered in a single edition (feature compatible with IBM Informix Enterprise Edition), through a CPU core-based licensing (subscription).

=== VectorAI DB ===
On April 28, 2026 Actian announced the launch of VectorAI DB, a portable vector database purpose-built to power production AI in regulated, disconnected, and edge environments where cloud-native solutions fall short. VectorAI DB handles real-world semantic query volumes without depending on cloud resources to scale.

=== Jaspersoft ===
Actian announced the addition of Jaspersoft on July 6, 2026, an embedded analytics and reporting platform. Jaspersoft generates operational reports, interactive dashboards, and data visualizations for routine business processes.
