= Comparison of storage engines in MySQL and MariaDB =

This is a comparison between notable database engines for the MySQL database management system (DBMS). A database engine (or "storage engine") is the underlying software component that a DBMS uses to create, read, update and delete (CRUD) data from a database.

Name	Vendor	License	Transactional	Under active development	MySQL versions	MariaDB versions
Archive	Oracle	GPL	No	Yes	5.0 – present	5.1 – present
Aria	MariaDB	GPL	No	Yes	—N/a	5.1 – present
Berkeley DB	Oracle	AGPLv3	Yes	No	? – 5.0	—N/a
BLACKHOLE	Oracle	GPL	No	Yes	5.0 – present	5.1 – present
CONNECT	MariaDB	GPL	No	Yes	—N/a	10.0 – present
CSV	Oracle	GPL	No	Yes	5.0 – present	5.1 – present
DuckDB	MariaDB	GPL	Yes	Yes	—N/a	experimental, unreleased
Falcon	Oracle	GPL	Yes	No	?	—N/a
Federated	Oracle	GPL	?	No	5.0 – present	?
FederatedX	MariaDB	GPL	Yes	No	—N/a	? – present
ColumnStore (formerly InfiniDB)	Calpont	GPL	Yes	Yes	—N/a	10.5.4 – present
InnoDB	Oracle	GPL	Yes	Yes	3.23 – present	5.1 – present
MEMORY	Oracle	GPL	No	Yes	3.23 – present	5.1 – present
Mroonga	Groonga Project	GPL	No	Yes	—N/a	10.0 – present
MyISAM	Oracle	GPL	No	No	3.23 – present	5.1 – present
MyRocks	Facebook	GPLv2	Yes	Yes	—N/a	10.2 – present
NDB	Oracle	GPLv2	Yes	Yes	?	—N/a
OQGRAPH	Oracle	GPLv2	No	No	—N/a	5.2 – present
S3	MariaDB	GPL	No	Yes	—N/a	10.5 – present
SEQUENCE	MariaDB	GPL	No	Yes	—N/a	10.0 – present
Sphinx	Sphinx Technologies Inc.	GPL	No	No	—N/a	5.2 – present
SPIDER	Kentoku Shiba	GPL	Yes	Yes	—N/a	10.0 – present
TempTable	Oracle	GPL	No	Yes	8.0 – present	—N/a
TidesDB (TideSQL)	TidesDB	GPLv2	Yes	Yes	experimental	11.8 – present
TokuDB	Percona	Modified GPL	Yes	No	—N/a	5.5 – 10.6
XtraDB	Percona	GPL	Yes	Yes	—N/a	5.1 – 10.1
