= MyRocks =

- Developer: Facebook, Inc.
- Release: 2015; 11 years ago
- Written in: C++
- Type: Database engine
- License: GPL 2.0
- Website: myrocks.io
- Repository: github.com/facebook/mysql-5.6

MyRocks is open-source software developed at Facebook in order to use MySQL features with RocksDB implementations. It is based on Oracle MySQL 5.6.

Starting from version 10.2.5, MariaDB includes MyRocks as an alpha-stage storage engine. MariaDB 10.3.7 includes MyRocks as a storage engine. MyRocks is also shipped with Percona Server.

The library was maintained by the Facebook Database Engineering Team.

== Features ==
RocksDB is optimized for fast, low-latency storage, and MyRocks is aimed at keeping the storage savings efficient.

MyRock's efficiency focuses on better space efficiency, better write efficiency, and better read efficiency.

- Better space efficiency means using less SSD storage.
- Better write efficiency means SSD endurance.
- Better read efficiency comes from more available IO capacity for handling queries.

== Benchmarks ==
Benchmark tests against 3 different instances – MyRocks (compressed), InnoDB (uncompressed), and InnoDB (compressed, 8 KB page size) – found:

- MyRocks was 2x smaller than InnoDB (compressed) and 3.5x smaller than InnoDB (uncompressed).
- MyRocks also has a 10x lower storage write rate compared to InnoDB.

With SSD database storage, this means less space used and a higher endurance of the storage over time.

== Support platforms ==
Per the MyRocks documentation:

The officially supported subset of platforms are:

- CentOS 6.8
- CentOS 7.2.x

Compiler toolsets with which the builds are verified:

- gcc 4.8.1
- gcc 4.9.0
- gcc 5.4.0
- gcc 6.1.0
- Clang 3.9.0

Best effort is made to support the following OSs:

- Ubuntu 14.04.4 LTS
- Ubuntu 15.10
- Ubuntu 16.04 LTS

== See also ==
- RocksDB
- Comparison of MySQL database engines
