= Virtual column =

In relational databases a virtual column is a table column whose value(s) is automatically computed using other columns values, or another deterministic expression. Virtual columns are defined of SQL:2003 as Generated Column, and are only implemented by some DBMSs, like MariaDB, SQL Server, Oracle, PostgreSQL, SQLite and Firebird (database server) (COMPUTED BY syntax).

== Implementation ==
There are two types of columns:

- Virtual columns
- Persistent columns

Virtual columns values are computed on the fly when needed, for example when they are returned by a SELECT statement. Persistent column values are computed when a row is inserted in a table, and they are written like all other values. They can change if other values change. Both virtual and persistent columns have advantages and disadvantages: virtual columns don't consume space on the disk, but they must be computed every time a query refers to them; persistent columns don't require any CPU time, but they consume disk space. However, sometimes a choice is not available, because some DBMS's support only one column type (or neither of them).

=== IBM Db2 ===
IBM Db2 supports Virtual column of Version 8 as Generated column.

=== MariaDB ===
MariaDB is a MySQL fork. Virtual columns were added in the 5.2 tree.

Expressions that can be used to compute the virtual columns have the following limitations:

- They must be deterministic
- They cannot return constant values
- They cannot use user-defined functions or stored procedures
- They cannot include other virtual columns
- They cannot make use of subqueries

Persistent columns can be indexed and can be part of a foreign key, with a few small limitations concerning constraint enforcement.

Virtual columns can only be used on tables which use a storage engine which supports them. Storage engines supporting virtual columns are:

- InnoDB
- MyISAM
- Aria

MRG_MyISAM tables can be based on MyISAM tables which include persistent columns; but the corresponding MRG_MyISAM column should be defined as a regular column.

==== Syntax ====
A CREATE TABLE or ALTER TABLE statement can be used to add a virtual column. The syntax used to define a virtual column is the following:

<type>  [GENERATED ALWAYS]  AS   ( <expression> )  [VIRTUAL | PERSISTENT]  [UNIQUE] [UNIQUE KEY] [COMMENT <text>]

- type is the column's data type
- expression is the SQL expression which returns the column's value for each row
- text is an optional column comment

=== MySQL ===
Support for virtual columns, known in MySQL as generated columns, started becoming available in MySQL 5.7. Various limitations on their use have been relaxed in subsequent versions.

=== Oracle ===
Since version 11g, Oracle supports virtual columns.

=== SQL Server ===
Microsoft SQL Server supports virtual columns, but they are called Computed Columns.

SQL Server supports both persisted and non-persisted computed columns.

=== Firebird ===
Firebird has always supported virtual columns as its precursor InterBase supports it, called Computed Columns.

Firebird supports virtual columns, not persistent ones and allows for sub-selects, calling built in functions, external functions and stored routines in the virtual column expression.

==== Syntax ====
Creating a virtual column can be done during table creation or when adding columns to an existing table. The syntax used to define a virtual column is the following:

column_name [type] COMPUTED BY (expression)

or the industry standard

column_name [type] GENERATED ALWAYS AS (expression)

=== PostgreSQL ===
Since version 12, PostgreSQL supports virtual columns, known as generated columns.

=== SQLite ===
Since version 3.31.0 (2020-01-22), SQLite supports virtual columns, known as generated columns.

== See also ==
- Derived column
