= MYD =

MYD may refer to:

- The IATA code for Malindi Airport
- .myd file extension, a MyISAM data file in MySQL
- The New Zealand Ministry of Youth Development, now part of the Ministry of Social Development
- The Manhattan Young Democrats
- Muslim American Society, Youth Division
- Myd (musician) (born 1987), French musician
