= MySQL Archive =

Database engine

ArchiveStorage Engine
- Original author: Brian Aker
- Release: 2004
- Written in: C, C++
- Operating system: Cross-platform
- Platform: x86, x86-64, SPARC, MIPS, PowerPC
- Type: Database engine
- License: GNU General Public License
- Website: mysql.bkbits.com

Archive is a storage engine for the MySQL relational database management system. Users can use this analytic storage engine to create a table that is “archive” only. Data cannot be deleted from this table, only added. The Archive engine uses a compression strategy based on the zlib library and it packs the rows using a bit header to represent nulls and removes all whitespace for character type fields. When completed, the row is inserted into the compression buffer and flushed to disk by an explicit flush table, a read, or the closing of the table.

One of the current restrictions of Archive tables is that they do not support any indexes, thus necessitating a table scan for any SELECT tasks. Archive tables, however, are supported by the MySQL Query Cache, which can dramatically reduce response times for Archive table queries that are repetitively issued. MySQL is examining index support for Archive tables in upcoming releases.

The engine is not ACID compliant. Unlike OLTP engines, it uses a "stream" format to disk with no block boundaries. The head of the Archive file generated is a byte array representing the data format and contents of that file. In MySQL 5.1, a copy of the MySQL FRM file is stored in the header of each Archive file. The FRM file, which represents the definition of a table, allows an Archive file to be restored to a MySQL server if the Archive file is copied to the server.

Despite the use of zlib, archive files are not compatible with gzio, the basis of the gzip tools. It uses its own azio system that is a fork of gzio.

Archive differs from the other MySQL analytical engine, MyISAM, by being a row-level locking engine and by keeping a constant version snapshot throughout a single query (making it MVCC). This means that Archive does not lock for concurrent bulk inserts. For bulk inserts it performs an interlaced INSERT, so unlike MyISAM, order is not guaranteed.

Users can use the archive_reader tool to take an online snapshot of a table and to change the characteristics of an archive file.

To create an Archive table, specify the following engine string:

create table t1 (
 a int,
 b varchar(32))
ENGINE=ARCHIVE

The MySQL Archive Storage Engine was authored and is maintained by Brian Aker. It was introduced in 2004 with MySQL 4.1.

The storage engine uses zlib compression to achieve high data density, making it suitable for log archiving and audit trail recording. It does not support transactions or indexing, with the exception of an optional AUTO_INCREMENT column.
