= Innobase =

Finnish company

Innobase was a Finnish company headquartered in Helsinki, Finland. Innobase is best known for being the developer of the InnoDB transactional storage engine for the MySQL open source database system. From 2005 on, Innobase was a subsidiary of Oracle Corporation, which acquired Innobase. It has been fully merged into Oracle and terminated all business activities as of July 8, 2013.

== History ==
In 1995 Heikki Tuuri founded Innobase to develop InnoDB. In September 2000 Innobase started collaboration with MySQL AB, which resulted in the release of MySQL that incorporated InnoDB in March 2001.

InnoDB was originally closed source, but was released to open source after Innobase failed to find a buyer for InnoDB and started collaboration with MySQL. MySQL tried to close a deal with Innobase in the following years, but eventually Oracle acquired Innobase in October, 2005. Oracle eventually also acquired Sun Microsystems, owner of MySQL AB, in January 2010.
