= Falcon (storage engine) =

Storage engine for the MySQL relational database management systems

- Original author(s): Jim Starkey
- Developer(s): Sun Microsystems
- Preview release: MySQL 6.0.9 / January 10, 2009
- Operating system: Cross-platform
- Type: Database engine
- License: GNU General Public License
- Website: www.mysql.com/mysql60/

Falcon is a discontinued transactional storage engine being developed for the MySQL relational database management system. Development was stopped after Oracle purchased MySQL. It was based on the Netfrastructure database engine. Falcon was designed to take advantage of Sun's ZFS file system.

Architecture analysis showed an interesting mixture of possible performance properties, while low level benchmarks on the first alpha release in 5.1.14-falcon showed that Falcon performed differently from both InnoDB and MyISAM. It did better in several tests, worse in others, with inefficient support for the MySQL LIMIT operation a limitation. Its biggest advantage though is known to be ease of use; Falcon requires minimum maintenance and designed to reconfigure itself automatically to handle all types of loads efficiently.

== See also ==
- InnoDB
- ISAM
- MyISAM
- XtraDB
