= MySQL Connector/ODBC =

- Developer(s): Oracle Corporation (originally MySQL AB)
- Operating system: Microsoft Windows, Linux, macOS, Unix-like
- Platform: Cross-platform
- Type: Database driver
- License: GPLv2 with FOSS License Exception
- Website: MySQL Connector/ODBC downloads

MySQL Connector/ODBC (formerly MyODBC) is an ODBC driver developed by Oracle Corporation for connecting ODBC-enabled applications to MySQL databases. It was originally created by MySQL AB and has been maintained by Oracle since the acquisition of Sun Microsystems in 2010.

== Overview ==
MySQL Connector/ODBC enables any application supporting ODBC—including business intelligence tools, office suites, custom applications, and legacy systems—to access, query, and manage MySQL databases using the ODBC interface.

== Platform support and installation ==
MySQL Connector/ODBC is available for Microsoft Windows, Linux, macOS, and other Unix-like systems. Both 32-bit and 64-bit builds are provided, depending on the system and application requirements.

The official downloads and detailed installation instructions are provided by Oracle. Step-by-step installation guides, including for Windows, are available from Informatica and Hevo Data.

== Configuration and usage ==
Connector/ODBC supports multiple configuration approaches:

- System DSNs, user DSNs, and file DSNs are supported on all platforms.
- DSN-less connections (using full connection strings) are widely used.
- Configuration for DSNs on Windows and macOS is described in official documentation.
- Connection pooling, authentication options, and example usages are extensively documented.

== Technical features ==
- Compliance with ODBC 3.51 and 3.8 specifications, partial ODBC 4.x support.
- Unicode and ANSI driver variants for Windows, only Unicode for Unix-like systems.
- Full support for transactions, savepoints, and rollbacks.
- Client-side and server-side prepared statements.
- Native access to MySQL data types, including JSON, BLOB, geometry, BIT.
- Authentication plugins and SSL/TLS encryption for secure connections.
- Bulk operations, streaming, connection pooling.
- Diagnostics, logging, error codes for troubleshooting.
- An API reference is maintained online.

== Version history ==
A detailed official changelog and history is maintained by Oracle.

- MyODBC 2.50/2.51: ANSI, MySQL 3.x
- 3.51: ANSI-only, ODBC 3.51 compliance
- 5.1–5.3: Unicode/ANSI, ODBC 3.8, 64-bit, DSN file support
- 8.0+: MySQL 8.0+ support, modern authentication, renewed 32-bit support (from 8.0.35)
- 9.x: Latest releases (as of July 2025: 9.3.0), MySQL 8.x and 9.x

== Practical integration and use cases ==
MySQL Connector/ODBC is commonly used for:

- Office integration (Excel, Access)
- Business Intelligence (Tableau, Crystal Reports, Power BI)
- ETL and migration between databases
- Application development in C, C++, Python, Java, .NET, PHP, and more
- Legacy system and cross-platform deployments

Practical deployment scenarios, configuration advice, and troubleshooting are available in [third-party technical articles].

== Troubleshooting and maintenance ==
Comprehensive troubleshooting and debugging guidance, including error code lists and reporting bugs, are part of the official documentation.

== See also ==
- MySQL
- Open Database Connectivity
- JDBC
- Database connector
- ODBC Data Source Administrator
