= Jim Starkey =

American computer businessman

- Born: 6 January 1949 (age 77); Illinois, USA
- Education: University of Wisconsin-Madison
- Known for: Multiversion concurrency control, Falcon
- Spouse: Ann W Harrison

Jim Starkey (born January 6, 1949, in Illinois) is a database architect responsible for developing InterBase, the first relational database to support multi-versioning, the blob column type, type event alerts, arrays and triggers. Starkey is the founder of several companies, including the web application development and database tool company Netfrastructure and NuoDB.

== Education and career ==
Jim Starkey graduated from University of Wisconsin at Madison, Wisconsin, with a Bachelor of Arts in Mathematics. After graduating, Starkey worked at Computer Corporation of America on a research project to build a database machine for ARPAnet.

Starkey's first major computer language was STOP, an assembler emulator written in 1965 and used by IIT for undergraduate instruction. Starkey joined Digital Equipment Corporation (DEC) in 1975. At DEC, he created the DATATRIEVE family of products, the DEC Standard Relational Interface, VAX Rdb/ELN, and designed the software architecture for DATATRIEVE'S database. He released DATATRIEVE Version 1 for the PDP-11 in 1977, VAX DATATRIEVE in 1981 as part of the VAX Information Architecture, Rdb/ELN, the Digital Standard Relational Interface, and a variety of uncommercialized database-centric and 4GL proofs of concept. Also at DEC, Starkey invented data BLOBs.

In 1984 he founded Groton Database Systems which became InterBase Software Corporation in 1986. Interbase was sold to Ashton-Tate in 1991, which in turn was sold to Borland. Borland subsequently incorporated InterBase in its Delphi product. After leaving Interbase, Starkey began a series of attempts to productize innovative database technology, including Netfrastructure. He is known fondly as "The Wolf" to Firebird SQL developers (which is an open source branch from InterBase v6.0).

In 2000, Starkey founded Netfrastructure, Inc., a platform for web applications including a relational database, integrated search, a Java virtual machine, and a context-sensitive page generator. Netfrastructure was acquired by MySQL and Starkey became a senior software architect at MySQL, where he started work on Falcon - a new transactional database engine based on the Netfrastructure codebase. He left MySQL in June 2008, a few months after Sun purchased MySQL AB, and Falcon never went beyond beta release.

In 2008, Jim Starkey incorporated a database company called NimbusDB. The name was formally changed to NuoDB in 2011. He is currently working on a new database model called AmorphousDB.

== Patents ==
Jim Starkey has been issued the following United States patents:

- “Database management system,” patented in 2012.
- “Database server system with methods for alerting clients of occurrence of database server events of interest to clients.”
- “Method and apparatus for generating web pages from templates”

== Personal life ==
Starkey is married to Ann Harrison, who is “a contributor to InterBase’s development.”
