= SQLBuddy =

Database administration tool

SQL Buddy
- Developer(s): Calvin Lough
- Repository: github.com/deliciousbrains/sqlbuddy
- Written in: PHP, XHTML, CSS, JavaScript
- Operating system: Cross-platform
- Type: Web database management
- License: Open-source / Permissive license
- Website: sqlbuddy.com

SQL Buddy is an open-source web-based application primarily coded in PHP, that allows users to control both MySQL and SQLite database through a web browser. The project was well regarded for its easy installation process and the friendly user interface it offered.

The application was further praised for its cross-platform compatibility, meaning users could manage their databases on various operating systems, including Linux, Windows, and macOS.

The development of SQL Buddy has stopped, with version 1.3.3 being the final release on January 18, 2011. No further releases are expected.
