= XtraDB =

Database storage engine

- Developer(s): Percona
- Stable release: 10.1
- Operating system: Cross-platform
- Type: Database engine
- License: GNU GPL v2 or proprietary
- Website: www.percona.com/software/percona-xtradb/

Percona XtraDB is a storage engine for the MariaDB and Percona Server databases, and is intended as a drop-in replacement to InnoDB, which is the default engine in MySQL.

Up until version 10.1, MariaDB used Percona XtraDB in place of InnoDB as the default storage engine. As of MariaDB 10.2, InnoDB is the default again.

XtraDB incorporates InnoDB's ACID-compliant design and MVCC architecture, and allows for a greater degree of tuning and scalability. The engine is also better suited to multi-core processing, which addresses some of the issues known to InnoDB.
