= Michael Widenius =

Finnish software programmer

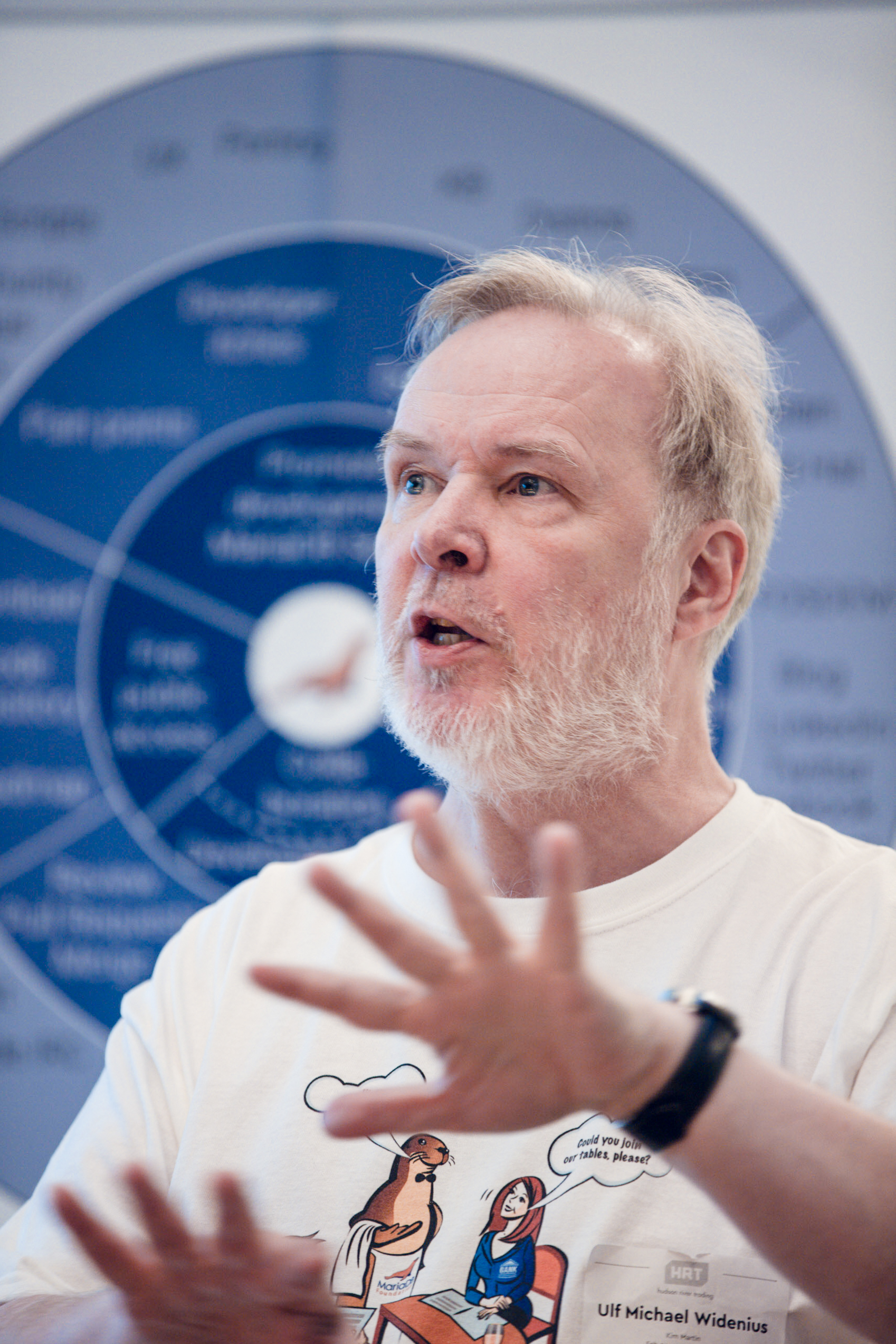
- Michael "Monty" Widenius, 2019
- Born: Ulf Michael Widenius; 3 March 1962 (age 64); Helsinki, Finland
- Other name: Monty
- Occupations: CTO of the MariaDB Corporation AB; Co-founder of MySQL AB; Author of the MySQL server and MariaDB fork; General partner at OpenOcean
- Children: 3: My, Max and Maria, whose names inspired MySQL, MaxDB and MariaDB.
- Website: monty-says.blogspot.com

Ulf Michael Widenius (born 3 March 1962), also known as Monty, is a Finnish software programmer. He is the main author of the original version of the open source MySQL database, a founding member of the MySQL AB company, founding member of the MariaDB Foundation and CTO of the MariaDB Company. Additionally, he is a founder and general partner at venture capital firm OpenOcean.

== Biography ==
=== Early years ===
Born in Helsinki, Finland, Widenius went to the co-educational school Broban, which was first merged into Minervaskolan and later to Lönnbeckska gymnasiet. After dropping out of Helsinki University of Technology, Widenius started working for Tapio Laakso Oy in 1981. In 1985 he founded TCX DataKonsult AB (a Swedish data warehousing company) with Allan Larsson. In 1995 he began writing the first version of the MySQL database with David Axmark, released in 1996. He is the co-author of the MySQL Reference Manual, published by O'Reilly in June 2002.

Until MySQL AB's sale to Sun Microsystems in 2008, he was the chief technical officer of MySQL AB. After the acquisition, he remained one of the primary forces behind the ongoing development of MySQL.

=== MySQL acquired by Sun ===
Widenius sold MySQL to Sun in January 2008, earning about €16.6 million in capital gains in 2008 (€16.8 million total income), making him one of the top 10 highest earners in Finland that year.

=== After Sun ===
In 2008, Widenius established venture capital firm OpenOcean with his MySQL AB colleague Patrik Backman and early advisors Tom Henriksson and Ralf Wahlsten.

On 5 February 2009, he announced that he was leaving Sun in order to create his own company.

On 12 December 2009, Widenius asked MySQL customers to lobby the European Commission (EC), regarding Oracle's acquisition of Sun, citing concerns about potential Oracle control of MySQL; this resulted in an online petition campaign called "Save MySQL".

After leaving Sun, he formed Monty Program Ab and forked MySQL into MariaDB, named after his youngest daughter, Maria. It includes several patches and plugins developed by the company itself or the community. One of these plugins is the Aria storage engine, which was renamed from Maria to avoid confusion with MariaDB. Monty Program Ab merged with SkySQL, who later renamed themselves MariaDB Corporation. In 2012, he was a founding member of the MariaDB Foundation, a non-profit organisation charged with promoting, protecting and advancing the MariaDB codebase, community, and ecosystem.

The Open Database Alliance, also known as ODBA, was founded in 2009 by the Monty Program and Percona. According to its first announcement, "the Open Database Alliance will comprise a collection of companies working together to provide the software, support and services for MariaDB, an enterprise-grade, community-developed branch of MySQL".

== Awards and recognition ==
Michael Widenius has received multiple recognitions and awards for his contributions to software development and the open-source movement, both within Finland and internationally.

In 2003 he was awarded the Finnish Software Entrepreneur of the Year prize.

In 2014, Widenius was honored with the Open World Hero award by COSS, the Finnish Centre for Open Systems and Solutions. This award is given annually to individuals or organizations that have made exceptional contributions to openness in information systems and ICT in Finland, with Widenius recognized for his enduring work to advance open-source principles and database technology.

In 2016 Tekniikan Akateemiset TEK listed Widenius as one of the most influential technology experts in Finland.

== Personal life ==
Widenius lives in Kauniainen, Finland with his second wife Anna and his youngest daughter, Maria. Widenius has three children – My, Max, and Maria – who inspired the names for MySQL, MaxDB and the MySQL-Max distribution, and MariaDB.
