= Percona =

Database software company

Percona is an American company based in Durham, North Carolina and the developer of a number of open source software projects for MySQL, MariaDB, PostgreSQL, MongoDB and RocksDB users. The company's revenue of around $25 million a year is derived from support, consultancy and managed services of database systems.

The company was founded in 2006 by Peter Zaitsev and Vadim Tkachenko.

== Open source software ==
Percona maintains a GitHub repository for their open source software, which can also be downloaded from the Percona website.

Percona PMM architecture

MySQL database software:

- Percona Server for MySQL
- Percona XtraDB Cluster
- Percona XtraBackup
- Percona Operator for MySQL based on Percona XtraDB Cluster

MongoDB database software:

- Percona Server for MongoDB
- Percona Operator for MongoDB
- Percona Backup for MongoDB

PostgreSQL database distribution:

- Percona Distribution for PostgreSQL
- Percona Operator for PostgreSQL

Database Management Tools

- Percona Monitoring and Management
- Percona Toolkit

== Other information ==
The company's founders, Peter Zaitsev and Vadim Tkachenko co-authored with Baron Schwartz the book High Performance MySQL (3rd edition), published by O’Reilly.
