= MySQL AB =

Former Swedish software company

- Type: Private company
- Industry: Computer software
- Genre: Database software
- Founded: 1995
- Founder: Michael Widenius, David Axmark and Allan Larsson
- Defunct: 2008
- Fate: Acquired by Sun Microsystems
- Successor: Oracle Corporation
- Headquarters: Uppsala, Sweden and Cupertino, California, U.S.
- Key people: Mårten Mickos, CEO; Dennis Wolf CFO and EVP; Mark C. Burton, EVP Sales; Zack Urlocker, EVP Products; Kaj Arnö, VP Open Source Community Relations; Ulf Sandberg, SVP Worldwide Services; Clint Smith, VP General Counsel; Larry Stefonic, SVP Asia Pacific; Kevin Harvey, Chairman; Allan Larsson
- Products: MySQL, MySQL Cluster
- Number of employees: 400
- Website: www.mysql.com

MySQL AB was a Swedish software company founded in 1995. It was acquired by Sun Microsystems in 2008, Sun was in turn acquired by Oracle Corporation in 2010. MySQL AB is the creator of MySQL, a relational database management system, as well as related products such as MySQL Cluster. The company was dually headquartered in Uppsala, Sweden, and Cupertino, California, with offices in other countries (France (Paris), Germany (Munich), Ireland (Dublin), Italy (Milan), and Japan (Tokyo)).

MySQL AB had 400 employees in 25 countries, and Open-source model companies. Around 70% of the employees were remote workers.

Together with Linux, Apache, and PHP, the MySQL Server forms one of the building blocks of the LAMP technology stack. The company claimed over 5 million MySQL installations and over 10 million product downloads in 2004.

== Revenue ==
MySQL AB representatives are commonly cited as champions of what they claim to be a "second generation" of open source companies. The revenues of both first and second generation open source companies usually derive from selling support, consulting services, and training for their products. What generally distinguishes this "second generation" of companies, such as MySQL AB and Trolltech, from earlier "open source" business models is dual licensing — the software is supplied under an open source license, but traditional software licences are also sold by the company that owns the software. As an example, MySQL AB makes MySQL available under the GPL at no charge, but sells it under other more traditional licenses to clients who do not find the GPL to be ideal for their purposes, such as inclusion of MySQL AB technology in a closed source product.

Other sources of revenue for MySQL AB were providing support and consulting, as well as training and certification for MySQL Server. Together with some additional services, MySQL also provided a subscription-based product called MySQL Enterprise, which is also resold by other companies such as Dell, HP, and Novell.

== History ==
- 1995 – Company founded by Michael Widenius, David Axmark, and Allan Larsson
- 2001 – Mårten Mickos elected CEO
- 2001 – First round financing by Scandinavian venture capitalists
- 2003 – Second round financing by a group of investors headed by Benchmark Capital
- 2003 – Partnership agreement concluded with SAP SE, acquiring the full commercial rights to MaxDB
- 2003 – Acquired Alzato, a subsidiary of Ericsson
- In February 2005 the MySQL Network subscription service was announced (later called MySQL Enterprise).

A third round of about $18.5 million financing led by Institutional Venture Partners, including Intel Capital, Red Hat, SAP Ventures, and others was disclosed in February 2006. On 16 January 2008, MySQL AB announced that it had agreed to be acquired by Sun Microsystems for approximately $1 billion. The acquisition completed on 26 February 2008. Oracle Corporation then acquired Sun in 2010.
