= InnoDB =

Storage engine for the MySQL database management system

- Developer: Oracle Corporation
- Written in: C
- Operating system: Cross-platform
- Type: Database engine
- License: GNU GPL v2 or proprietary
- Website: dev.mysql.com/doc/refman/8.1/en/innodb-storage-engine.html

InnoDB is a storage engine for the database management system MySQL and MariaDB. Since the release of MySQL 5.5.5 in 2010, it replaced MyISAM as MySQL's default table type. It provides the standard ACID-compliant transaction features, along with foreign key support (declarative referential integrity). It is included as standard in most binaries distributed by MySQL AB, the exception being some OEM versions.

== Description ==
InnoDB became a product of Oracle Corporation after its acquisition of the Finland-based company Innobase in October 2005. The software is dual licensed; it is distributed under the GNU General Public License, but can also be licensed to parties wishing to combine InnoDB in proprietary software.

InnoDB supports:

- Both SQL and XA transactions
- Tablespaces
- Foreign keys
- Full text search indexes, since MySQL 5.6 (February 2013) and MariaDB 10.0
- Spatial operations, following the OpenGIS standard
- Virtual columns, in MariaDB

== See also ==
- Comparison of MySQL database engines
