= Percona Server for MySQL =

Distribution of the MySQL relational database management system created by Percona

- Developer: Percona
- Initial release: 2006
- Stable release: 8.0.37-29 / 2024-08-06[±]
- Repository: github.com/percona/percona-server
- Written in: C, C++, Perl, Bash
- Operating system: Cross-platform (Unix, Solaris, Linux, OS X).
- Available in: English
- Type: RDBMS
- License: GNU General Public License (version 2)
- Website: www.percona.com/software/percona-server

Percona Server for MySQL is a distribution of the MySQL relational database management system created by Percona. It is similar to MySQL Enterprise from Oracle Corporation.

Percona Server for MySQL is an open source relational database management system (RDBMS). It is a free, fully compatible drop in replacement for Oracle MySQL. The software includes a number of scalability, availability, security and backup features only available in MySQL's commercial Enterprise edition. The software includes XtraDB, an enhanced distribution of the InnoDB Storage Engine.

The developers aim to retain close compatibility to the official MySQL releases, while focusing on performance and increased visibility into server operations.

== See also ==
- Comparison of relational database management systems
