= Mårten Mickos =

Finnish businessman

Mårten Gustaf Mickos
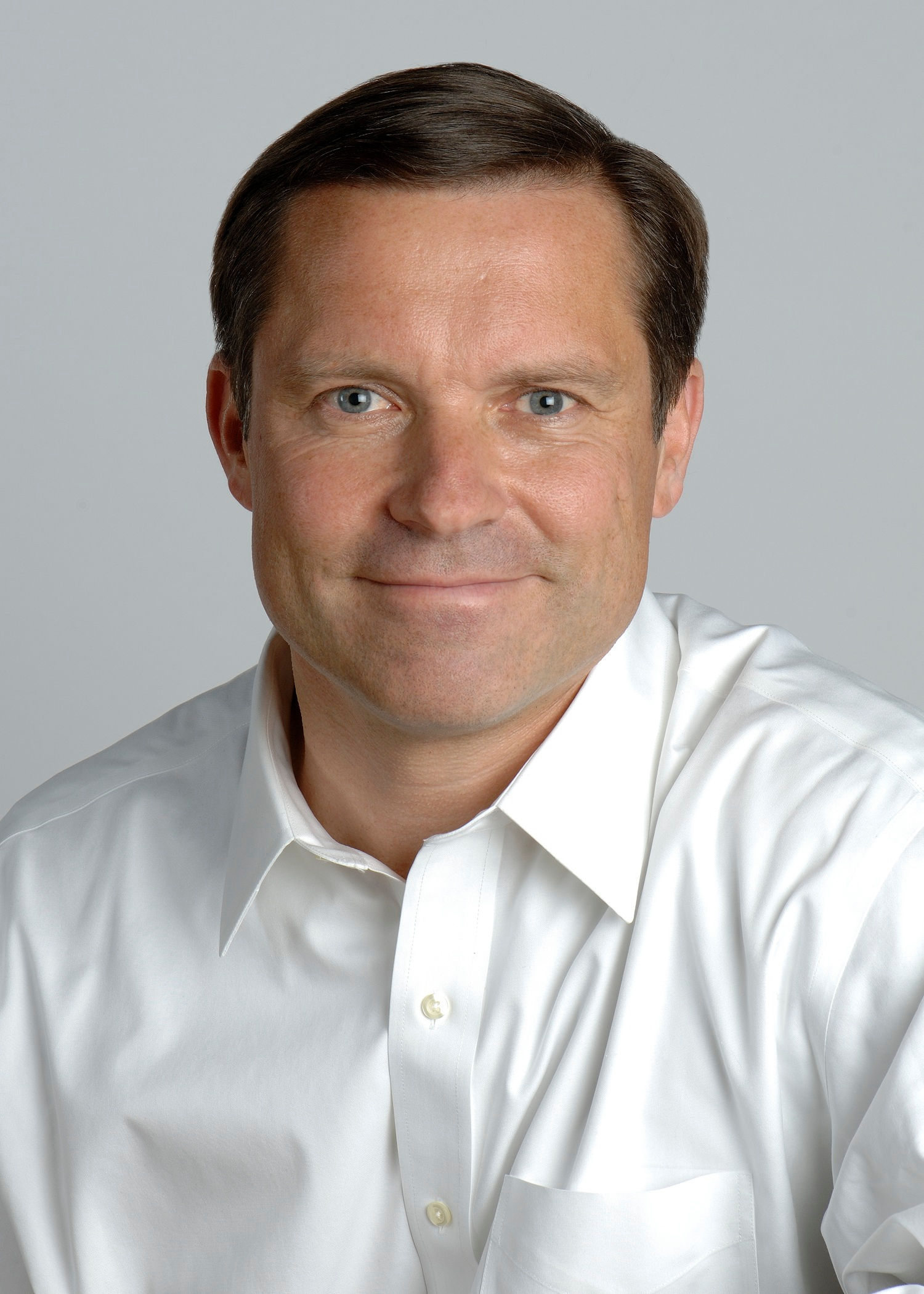
- Born: November 6, 1962 (age 64); Espoo, Finland
- Education: Helsinki University of Technology
- Occupations: Startup advisor, board member

Mårten Gustaf Mickos (born November 6, 1962, in Espoo, Finland) is a Finnish-Swedish technology CEO and executive. He was the CEO of HackerOne, a security vulnerability coordination and bug bounty platform from 2015 to 2024 and the CEO of cloud computing company Eucalyptus Systems from 2010 to 2014, when the company was acquired by Hewlett-Packard and Mickos was appointed GM of HP's Cloud Business Unit.

Mickos was chief executive officer of MySQL AB from 2001 to 2008, when Sun Microsystems bought MySQL AB. He served as senior vice president of the database group at Sun Microsystems until March 2009.

Mickos moved from Finland to the United States in 2003. He has lived in Los Altos Hills, CA and San Francisco, CA and currently resides in Seattle, WA.

== Early life and education ==
Mickos is the third born of four siblings, and was raised in the town of Kauniainen, outside Helsinki, Finland. The family later moved to Jakobstad, where Mickos attended high school. His parents were both engineers by training.

Mickos studied technical physics at Helsinki University of Technology (now called Aalto University), and graduated with a M.Sc. degree. In 1987 he co-founded the company Polycon Ab with student friends at the age of 24.

== Career ==
Mickos was a co-founder and CEO of MatchON Sports Ltd. Prior to this, he was CEO of Sonera subsidiary Intellitel Communications Inc, and held sales and marketing positions at Solid Information Technology Ltd and other software companies.

Mickos became CEO of MySQL AB in January 2001 and served in this role until February 2008. During this time, he became a voice for the value of, and business model behind, commercial open source. He oversaw that settlement with NuSphere Corp over a dispute regarding the use of MySQL AB's trademarks and copyrights and compliance with the GNU General Public License (GPL). After Sun acquired MySQL in February 2008 for $1 billion, Mickos served as Senior Vice President of Sun's database group until March 2009.

From 2009 to 2010, Mickos was the Entrepreneur In Residence of the venture capital firms Benchmark Capital and Index Ventures.

In 2009, Mickos participated as an expert witness for the European Commission when they were examining the Oracle-MySQL merger because of their concern over an antitrust issue.

In March 2010, Mickos was appointed CEO of Eucalyptus Systems, the company behind the Eucalyptus open source software for cloud computing on computer clusters. When Hewlett-Packard acquired Eucalyptus in September 2014, they appointed Mickos SVP and GM of HP's Cloud Business Unit. Mickos left HP in October 2015.

Mickos served on the Board of directors of Nokia Corporation from 2012 to 2015. He also served on the boards of Electrosonic, RightScale, Mozilla Messaging and the Node.js Foundation.

Mickos served as the CEO of the bug bounty platform company HackerOne from 2015 to 2024. In May 2024, Mickos announced plans to transition from his CEO position and to continue as a strategic advisor for HackerOne. The leadership transition was finalized in September 2024, with Kara Sprague appointed as CEO effective November 2024.

From 2019 to 2024, Mickos served as the Honorary Consul of Finland in San Francisco.

In 2025, Mickos became the Executive in Residence at his alma mater, Aalto University, with responsibility for launching and building the Aalto Founders School, a new entrepreneurship program.

== Personal life ==
Mickos and his wife married in 1988. They raised three children, now adults, in Finland and California. The couple divorced in 2015.

== Awards and recognition ==
Mickos has received the following awards and recognition:

- Honorary doctor of technology at Aalto University in 2022
- Honorary member of Academic Engineers and Architects in Finland TEK in 2022
- Member of the Swedish Academy of Engineering Sciences in Finland since 2012
- #65 on Business Insider's 2016 Silicon Valley 100 list
- Nordic Entrepreneur of the Year prize by Silicon Vikings in 2012
- Audemars Piguet "Changing Times Award: European Entrepreneur of the Year 2006"
- 2006 Nokia Foundation Award
