= Guarantee =

Legal term

A guarantee is a form of transaction in which one person, to obtain some trust, confidence or credit for another, agrees to be answerable for them. It may also designate a treaty through which claims, rights or possessions are secured. It is to be differentiated from the colloquial "personal guarantee" in that a guarantee is a legal concept which produces an economic effect. A personal guarantee, by contrast, is often used to refer to a promise made by an individual which is supported by, or assured through, the word of the individual. In the same way, a guarantee produces a legal effect wherein one party affirms the promise of another (usually to pay) by promising to themselves pay if default occurs.

In legal terminology, the giver of a guarantee is called the surety or the "guarantor". The person to whom the guarantee is given is the creditor or the "obligee"; while the person whose payment or performance is secured thereby is termed "the obligor", "the principal debtor", or simply "the principal".

Sureties have been classified as follows:

1. Those in which there is an agreement to constitute, for a particular purpose, the relation of principal and surety, to which agreement the secured creditor is a party;
2. those in which there is a similar agreement between the principal and surety only, to which the creditor is a stranger;
3. those in which, without any such contract of suretyship, there is a primary and a secondary liability of two persons for one and the same debt, the debt being, as between the two, that of one of those persons only, and not equally of both, so that the other, if they should be compelled to pay it, would be entitled to reimbursement from the person by whom (as between the two) it ought to have been paid.

== Etymology ==
Guarantee is sometimes spelt "guarantie" or "guaranty". It is from an Old French form of "warrant", from the Germanic word which appears in German as wahren: to defend or make safe and binding.

== Common law ==
=== England ===
In English law, a guarantee is a contract whereby the person (the guarantor) enters into an agreement to pay a debt, or effect the performance of some duty by a third person who is primarily liable for that payment or performance. The extent of the debt that the guarantor is liable to this debt is co-extensive to the obligation of the third-party. It is a collateral contract, which does not extinguish the original obligation for payment or performance and is secondary to the primary obligation. It is rendered null and void if the original obligation fails. Two forms of guarantee exists in England:

1. guarantees creating a conditional payment, wherein if the principal fails, the guarantor will pay. Under this form, the guarantee is not enforceable until failure occurs.
2. a "see-to-it" obligation, where the guarantor's obligation is to ensure that the principal will carry out the obligation. Failure of the principal to do so will automatically make the guarantor in breach of his contractual obligation, on which the creditor can sue.

The liabilities of a guarantor in law depend upon those of the principal debtor, and when the principal's obligations cease the guarantor's do too, except in certain cases where the discharge of the principal debtor is by the operation of the law. The co-extensive, secondary nature of the liability of the guarantor along with the fact that the guarantee is a contract to answer default, debt, or miscarriage; crucially differentiates the guarantee from an indemnity. If, for example, a person wrongly supposes that someone is liable to them, and a guarantee is given on that erroneous basis, the guarantee is invalid by virtue of the law of contracts, because its foundation (that another was liable) failed.

No special phraseology is necessary to form a guarantee. What distinguishes a guarantee from insurance is not any difference between the words "insurance" and "guarantee", but the substance of the contract entered into by the parties.

The statutory requisites of a guarantee are, in England, prescribed firstly by the statute of frauds, which provides in section 4 that "no action shall be brought whereby to charge the defendant upon any special promise to answer for the debt, default or miscarriages of another person, unless the agreement upon which such action shall be brought, or some memorandum or note thereof, shall be in writing and signed by the party to be charged therewith, or some other person thereunto by him lawfully authorized". This in effect means that a guarantee is not invalid but are merely unenforceable through a chose in personam. The requirement for a signature in writing was clarified in Elpis Maritime Co v. Marti Chartering Co Inc (the "Maria D") [1992] 1 AC 21 and J Pereia Fernandes SA v. Mehta [2006] EWHC 813 (Ch). In the former, an agreement had been signed by a party purporting to have signed only as an agent, but this fact was considered insignificant. In the latter, it was held that a contract was enforceable either by written agreement signed by the guarantor or his agent OR; if the guarantee was oral, a separate note or memorandum of the agreement could make the guarantee similarly enforceable. In the former, the court held it was sufficient that it was written or printed by the guarantor, an initial within an email was sufficient but a standard header name in an email was not. The court believed that the minor action was sufficient to engage the Statute as it had long been held that a single fingerprint, or "X" was sufficient. The Electronic Communications Act 2000 created a power to issue statutory instruments to modify legislation so as to be congruent with modern use of electronic communications. This is congruent with Article 9 of the EU Directive on Electronic Commerce 2000, this specifically allowed exceptions to the 'in writing' requirement of a guarantee. It has even been held that clicking a button to confirm personal details sufficiently discharges the Statute of Frauds requirement.

The second requisite is Lord Tenterden's Act (9 Geo. 4. c. 14), which enacts that "no action shall be brought whereby to charge any person upon or by reason of any representation or assurance made or given concerning or relating to the character, conduct, credit, ability, trade or dealings of any other person, to the intent or purpose that such other person may obtain credit, money or goods upon unless such representation or assurance be made in writing signed by the party to be charged therewith". Lord Tenterden's Act, which applies to incorporated companies and to individual persons, was rendered necessary by an evasion of the statute of frauds, treating the guarantee for a debt, default or miscarriage, when not in writing as a fraudulent representation, giving rise to damages for a tort.

==== Statute of frauds ====
The statute of frauds does not invalidate a verbal guarantee, but renders it unenforceable. It may therefore be available to support a defense to an action, and money paid under it cannot be recovered. An indemnity is not a guarantee within the statute, unless it contemplates the primary liability of a third person. It need not, therefore, be in writing when it is only a promise to become liable for a debt if the person to whom the promise is made should become liable.

Neither does the statute apply to the promise of a del credere agent to make no sales on behalf of his principal except to persons who are absolutely solvent, and renders the agent liable for any loss that may result from the non-fulfilment of his promise. A promise to give a guarantee is within the statute, though not one to procure a guarantee. The general principles which determine what are guarantees within the statute of frauds are: (1) the primary liability of a third person must exist or be contemplated; (2) the promise must be made to the creditor; (3) there must be no liability by the surety independent of an express promise of guarantee; (4) the main object of the parties to the guarantee must be the fulfilment of a third party's obligation; and (5) the contract entered into must not amount to a sale by the creditor to the promiser of the security for a debt or of the debt itself.

As regards the kind of note or memorandum of the guarantee that will satisfy the statute of frauds, "no special promise to be made, by any person after the passing of this act, to answer for the debt, default or miscarriage of another person, being in writing and signed by the party to be charged, or some other person by him thereunto lawfully authorized, shall be deemed invalid to support an action, suit or other proceeding, to charge the person by whom such promise shall have been made, by reason only that the consideration for such promise does not appear in writing or by necessary inference from a written document." Any writing embodying the terms of the agreement between the parties and signed by the party to be charged is sufficient; and the idea of agreement need not be present to the mind of the person signing. It is, however, necessary that the names of the contracting parties should appear somewhere in writing; that the party to be charged, or his agent, should sign the agreement or another paper referring to it; and that, when the note or memorandum is made, a complete agreement shall exist. The memorandum need not be contemporaneous with the agreement itself.

=== United States ===
In the United States, but not apparently elsewhere, there is a distinction between a surety and a guarantor. A surety is usually bound with the principal, at the same time and on the same consideration, while the contract of a guarantor is his own separate undertaking and the guarantor is not liable until due diligence has been exerted to compel the principal debtor to make good any default. There is no privity of contract between a surety and the principal debtor. Rather, the surety contracts with the creditor and is not jointly liable to the creditor.

=== Other common law jurisdictions ===
In India, a guarantee may be either oral or written, while in Australia, Jamaica and Sri Lanka it must be in writing.

The Irish Statute of Frauds has provisions identical to those found in the English Statute of Frauds.

== Civil law ==
According to various existing civil codes, a suretyship, when the underlying obligation is "non-valuable", is null and void unless the invalidity is the result of personal incapacity of the principal debtor In some countries, however, the mere personal incapacity of a minor to borrow suffices to eliminate the guarantee of a loan made to him The Egyptian codes sanction guarantees expressly entered into "in view of debtor's want of legal capacity" to contract a valid principal obligation The Portuguese code retains the surety's liability, in respect of an invalid principal obligation, until the latter has been legally rescinded.

According to several codes civil sureties are divided into conventional, legal and judicial, while the Spanish code further divides them into gratuitous and for valuable consideration.

The German code civil requires the surety's promise to be verified by writing where he has not executed the principal obligation. The Portuguese code renders a guarantee provable by all the modes established by law for the proof of the principal contract According to most civil codes civil a guarantee like any other contract can usually be made verbally in the presence of witnesses and in certain cases (where for instance considerable sums of money are involved) sous signature privee or by a judicial or notarial instrument. The French and Belgian Codes, moreover, provide that suretyship is not to be presumed but must always be expressed.

== Contract law ==
In England the common-law requisites of a guarantee are the same as any other contract. The mutual assent of two or more parties, competency to contract and valuable consideration. An offer to guarantee must be accepted, either by express or implied acceptance.

If a surety's assent to a guarantee has been procured by fraud by the person to whom it is given, there is no binding contract. Fraud may consist of suppression, concealment or misrepresentation. However, only facts that are really material to the risk undertaken need be spontaneously disclosed. The competency of the parties to enter into a contract of guarantee may be affected by insanity or intoxication of the surety, if known to the creditor, or by any disability. The ordinary disabilities are those of minors.

In some guarantees the consideration is "entire". For example, in consideration for a lease being granted, the surety becomes answerable for the performance of the covenants of the lease. In other cases it is "fragmentary" or supplied from time to time, as where a guarantee is given to secure the balance of a running account at a bank, for goods supplied When the consideration is "entire", the guarantee runs on through the duration of the lease and is irrevocable. When the consideration is "fragmentary", unless the guarantee stipulates to the contrary, the surety may at any time terminate his liability under the guarantee.

Total failure of consideration or illegal consideration by the party giving a guarantee will prevent its being enforced. Though in all countries the mutual assent of two or more parties is essential to the formation of any contract, a consideration is not everywhere regarded as a necessary element. Thus in Scotland a contract may be binding without a consideration to support it.

== Cross guarantees ==
Cross guarantees are created where two or more related businesses or individuals agree to guarantee each others' liabilities and obligations. Cross guarantees enable businesses within a corporate group to support each other with raising finance, reducing risk to lenders, or to win contracts based on a stronger financial position.

== Liability ==
The liability incurred by a surety under his guarantee depends upon its terms, and is not necessarily coextensive with that of the principal debtor. It is, however, obvious that the surety's obligation cannot exceed that of the principal. By many existing civil codes, however, a guarantee which imposes on the surety a greater liability than that of the principal is not invalidated but is merely reducible to that of the principal. However, in India the liability of the surety is, unless otherwise provided by contract, coextensive with that of the principal.

Where the liability of the surety is less extensive in amount than that of the principal debtor, questions have arisen in England and America as to whether the surety is liable only for part of the debt equal to the limit of his liability, or, up to such limit, for the whole debt. The surety cannot be made liable except for a loss sustained by reason of the default guaranteed against. Moreover, in the case of a joint and several guarantee by several sureties, unless all sign it none are liable thereunder. The limit of the surety's liability must be construed so as to give effect to what may fairly be inferred to have been the intention of the parties as expressed in writing. In cases of doubtful import, recourse to parol evidence is permissible, to explain, but not to contradict, the written evidence of the guarantee.

As a general rule, the surety is not liable if the principal debt cannot be enforced. It has never been actually decided in England whether this rule holds good in cases where the principal debtor is a minor and on that account is not liable to the creditor. When directors guarantee the performance by their company of a contract which is beyond their authority, and therefore not binding on the company, the directors' liability is enforceable against them personally.

=== Termination of liability ===
It is not always easy to determine for how long liability under a guarantee endures. Sometimes a guarantee is limited to a single transaction, and is obviously intended to be security against one specific default only. On the other hand, it as often happens that it is not exhausted by one transaction on the faith of it, but extends to a series of transactions, and remains a standing security until it is revoked, either by the act of the parties or by the death of the surety. It is then termed a continuing guarantee.

No fixed rules of interpretation determine whether a guarantee is a continuing one or not, but each case must be judged on its individual merits. Frequently, in order to achieve a correct construction, it becomes necessary to examine the surrounding circumstances, which often reveal what was the subject matter which the parties contemplated when the guarantee was given, and what was the scope and object of the transaction between them. Most continuing guarantees are either ordinary business securities for advances made or goods supplied to the principal debtor or else bonds for the good behavior of persons in public or private offices or employment. With regard to the latter class of continuing guarantees, the surety's liability is, generally speaking, revoked by any change in the constitution of the persons to or for whom the guarantee is given. In England the Commissioners of His Majesty's Treasury may vary the character of any security, given for good behavior by the heads of public departments given by companies for the due performance of the duties of an office or employment in the public service.

=== Limitation of liability ===
Before the surety can be rendered liable on his guarantee, the principal debtor must have made default. When, however, this has occurred, the creditor, in the absence of express agreement to the contrary, may sue the surety, without informing him of such default having taken place before proceeding against the principal debtor or resorting to securities for the debt received from the latter. In those countries where the municipal law is based on the Roman law, sureties usually possess the right (which may, however, be renounced by them) of compelling the creditor to insist on the goods, etc. (if any) of the principal debtor being first "discussed", i.e., appraised and sold, and appropriated to the liquidation of the debt guaranteed before having recourse to the sureties. This right "accords with a common sense of justice and the natural equity of mankind". In England this right has never been fully recognized, nor does it prevail in America and Scotland.

In England, however, before any demand for payment has been made by the creditor on the surety, the latter can, as soon as the principal debtor has made default, compel the creditor, on giving him an indemnity against costs and expenses, to sue the principal debtor if the latter is solvent and able to pay. and a similar remedy is also open to the surety in America. In neither of these countries nor in Scotland can one of several sureties, when sued for the whole guaranteed debt by the creditor, compel the latter to divide his claim among the sureties, and reduce it to the share and proportion of each surety. However, this beneficium divisionis, as it is called in Roman law, is recognized by many existing codes.

=== Enforcement of liability ===
The usual mode in England of enforcing liability under a guarantee is by action in the High Court or the County Court. It is also permissible for the creditor to obtain redress by means of a set-off or counterclaim, in an action brought against him by the surety. On the other hand, the surety may now, in any court in which the action on the guarantee is pending, avail himself of any set-off which may exist between the principal debtor and the creditor. Moreover, if one of several sureties for the same debt is sued by the creditor or his guarantee, he can, by means of a third-party complaint, claim contribution from his co-sureties towards the common liability. Independent proof of the surety's liability under his guarantee must always be given at the trial. The creditor cannot rely on admissions made by or a judgment or award against the principal debtor.

A person liable as a surety for another under a guarantee possesses rights against the person to whom the guarantee was given. As regards the surety's rights against the principal debtor, where the guarantee was made with the debtors consent but not otherwise, after he has made default, be compelled by the surety to exonerate him from liability by payment of the guaranteed debt. If the surety has paid any portion of the guaranteed debt, the surety is entitled to rank as a creditor for the amount paid and to compel repayment.

In the event of the principal debtor's bankruptcy, the surety can in England act against the bankrupt's estate, not only in respect of payments made before the bankruptcy of the principal debtor, but also, it seems, in respect of the contingent liability to pay under the guarantee. If the creditor has already acted, the surety who has paid the guaranteed debt has a right to all dividends received by the creditor from the bankrupt in respect to the guaranteed debt, and to stand in the creditor's place as to future dividends. The rights of the surety against the creditor are in England exercisable even by one who in the first instance was a principal debtor, but has since become a surety, by arrangement with his creditor.

=== Rights of surety against the creditor ===
The surety's principal right against the creditor entitles him, after payment of the guaranteed debt, to the benefit of all securities which the creditor held against the principal debtor. If the creditor has lost these securities by default or laches or rendered them otherwise unavailable, the surety is discharged pro tanto. This right, which is not in abeyance till the surety is called on to pay extends to all securities, whether satisfied or not. "[E]very person who being surety for the debt or duty of another, or being liable with another for any debt or duty, shall pay such debt or perform such duty, shall be entitled to have assigned to him, or to a trustee for him, every judgment, specialty, or other security, which shall be held by the creditor in respect of such debt or duty, whether such judgment, specialty, or other security shall or shall not be deemed at law to have been satisfied by the payment of the debt or performance of the duty, and such person shall be entitled to stand in the place of the creditor, and to use all the remedies, and, if need be, and upon a proper indemnity, to use the name of the creditor, in any action or other proceeding at law or in equity, in order to obtain from the principal debtor, or any co-surety, co-contractor, or co-debtor, as the case may be, indemnification for the advances made and loss sustained by the person who shall have so paid such debt or performed such duty; and such payment or performance so made by such surety shall not be pleadable in bar of any such action or other proceeding by him, provided always that no co-surety, co-contractor, or co-debtor shall be entitled to recover from any other co-surety, co-contractor, or co-debtor, by the means aforesaid, more than the just proportion to which, as between those parties themselves, such last-mentioned person shall be justly liable". The right of the surety to be subrogated on payment by him of the guaranteed debt, to all the rights of the creditor against the principal debtor is recognized in America and many other countries.

=== Rights of surety against other sureties ===
A surety is entitled to contribution from a co-surety in respect of their common liability. This particular right is not the result of any contract, but is derived from an equity, on the ground of equality of burden and benefit, and exists whether the sureties be bound jointly, or jointly and severally, and by the same, or different, instruments. There is, however, no right of contribution where each surety is severally bound for a given portion only of the guaranteed debt; nor in the case of a surety for a surety; nor where a person becomes a surety jointly with another and at the latter's request. Contribution may be enforced, either before payment, or as soon as the surety has paid more than his share of the common debt; and the amount recoverable is now always regulated by the number of solvent sureties, though formerly this rule only prevailed in equity. In the event of the bankruptcy of a surety, proof can be made against his estate by a co-surety for any excess over the latter's contributive share. The right of contribution is not the only right possessed by co-sureties against each other, but they are also entitled to the benefit of all securities which have been taken by any one of them as an indemnity against the liability incurred for the principal debtor.

The Roman law did not recognize the right of contribution among sureties. It is, however, sanctioned by many existing codes.

=== Discharge of liability ===
The most prolific ground of discharge of a guarantor usually arises from the creditor's conduct. The governing principle is that if the creditor violates any rights which the surety possessed when he entered into the suretyship, even though the damage is only nominal, the guarantee cannot be enforced. The surety's discharge may be accomplished (1) by a variation of the terms of the contract between the creditor and the principal debtor, or of that between the creditor and the surety; (2) by the creditor taking a new security from the principal debtor in lieu of the original one; (3) by the creditor discharging the principal debtor from liability; (4) by the creditor binding himself to give time to the principal debtor for payment of the guaranteed debt; or (5) by loss of securities received by the creditor in respect of the guaranteed debt. The first four of these acts are collectively termed a novation. In general whatever extinguishes the principal obligation necessarily determines that of the surety, not only in England but elsewhere. By most civil codes the surety is discharged by conduct of the creditor inconsistent with the surety's rights, although the rule prevailing in England, Scotland, America and India which releases the surety from liability when the creditor extends without the surety's consent the time for fulfilling the principal obligation, while recognized by two existing codes civil, is rejected by the majority of them. A revocation of the contract of suretyship by act of the parties, or in certain cases by the death of the surety, may also operate to discharge the surety.

The death of a surety does not per se determine the guarantee, but, save where from its nature the guarantee is irrevocable by the surety himself, it can be revoked by express notice after his death, or by the creditor becoming receiving constructive notice of the death; except where, under the testator's will, the executor has the option of continuing the guarantee, in which case the executor should specifically withdraw the guarantee in order to terminate it. If one of a number of joint and several sureties dies, the future liability of the survivors continues, at least until it has been terminated by express notice. In such a case, however, the estate of the deceased surety would be relieved from liability. The statute of limitations may bar the right of action on guarantees subject to variation by statute in any U.S. state where the guarantee is sought to be enforced.

=== Personal liability ===
In Manches LLP v Carl Freer (2006) EWHC 991, a company director guaranteed his companies' payments of solicitors' fees in the event that his companies failed to pay them. The High Court found that he had signed the guarantee on behalf of his companies and not in a personal capacity, and he was therefore not personally liable for the unpaid debts. This ruling can be contrasted with the ruling based on different facts in Young v Schuler (1883) 11 QBD 651, where "the issue was whether Schuler had signed an agreement simply under a power of attorney on behalf of one of the named parties or, additionally, on his own behalf as a guarantor".

== See also ==
- Bank guarantee
- Job guarantee
- Money back guarantee
- Service guarantee
