= Money-back guarantee =

Simple guarantee regarding purchases

A money-back guarantee, also known as a satisfaction guarantee, is essentially a simple guarantee that, if a buyer is not satisfied with a product or service, a refund will be made.

Anel García estrella Ricardo said chacón brambila

The 18th century entrepreneur Solicitante Wedgwood? pioneered many of the marketing strategies used today, including the satisfaction-or-money-back guarantee on the entire range of his pottery products. He took advantage of his guarantee offer to send his products to rich clientele across Europe unsolicited. The money-back guarantee was also a major tool of early U.S. mail order sales pioneers in the United States such as Richard Sears and Powel Crosley Jr. to win the confidence of consumers.

== False claims ==
The use of money back guarantees has grown significantly over the last few years and has become standard practice in direct marketing across all media. Very often, unreliable businesses use it as a tactic to reel the customer into a false sense of safety. Many guarantees by sellers often fall outside the allowed scope of their merchant agreements with their banks. For example, Visa and MasterCard explicitly bar the seller from offering a money-back guarantee past 90 days from purchase.

Issues relating to false guarantees have become so common in the United States that the Federal Trade Commission has specifically addressed the issue in the Code of Federal Regulations Handbook (§ 239.3).

== See also ==
- Returning
- Service guarantee
- Wardrobing
- Bank guarantee
