= David Axmark =

Swedish computer expert & businessman (born 1962)

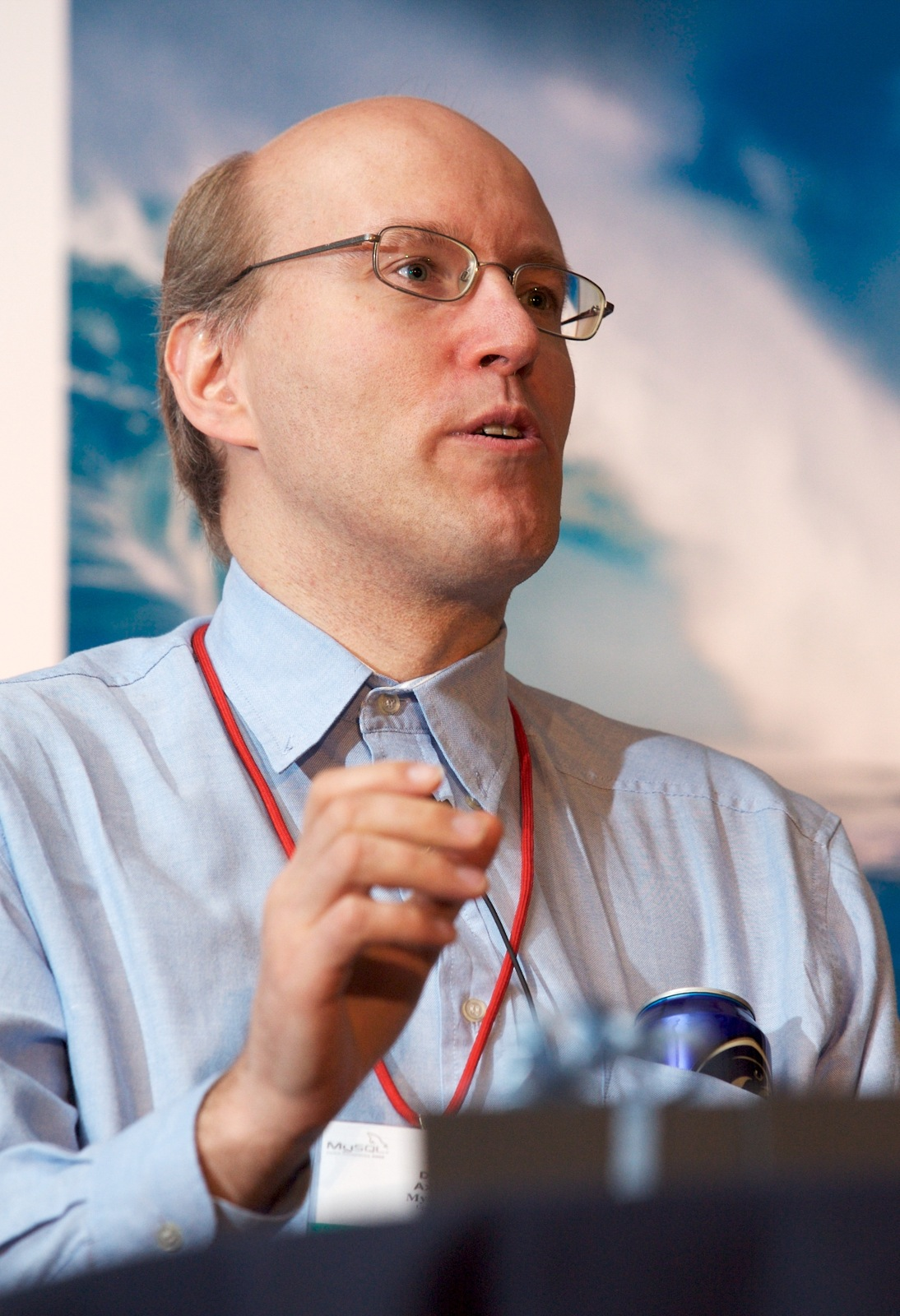
- David Axmark at the MySQL Users Conference, 2006
- Born: May 28, 1962 (age 62); Sweden
- Occupation: Co-Founder of MySQL AB

David Axmark, born 28 May 1962 in Sweden, is one of the founders of MySQL AB and a developer of the free database server, MySQL. He has been involved with MySQL development from its beginning along with the fellow co-founder Michael Widenius. He studied at Uppsala University between 1980 and 1984

David has been involved with free software since 1980 and has said he is committed to developing a successful business model using free open source software. During early 2010 David made a Series A financing for OrangeHRM, "The World's Most Popular Open Source Human Resource Management Software". David is a director at OrangeHRM.

On 4 December 2012, David Axmark, together with the other MySQL founders, Michael "Monty" Widenius and Allan Larsson, announced the MariaDB Foundation.
