= Bug hunting =

Bug hunting may refer to:

- Insect collecting, the collection of insects and other arthropods for scientific study or as a hobby
- Debugging, the finding and resolving software bugs
- Bug bounty program, rewards offered to a those who identify bugs related to security and other vulnerabilities in a software system.
