= Consul (diplomacy) =

Diplomatic rank

In diplomacy, a consul is an official representative of a government who resides in a foreign country to assist and protect citizens of the consul's country, and to promote and facilitate commercial and diplomatic relations between the two countries.

A consul is generally part of a government's diplomatic corps or foreign service, and thus enjoys certain privileges and protections in the host state, albeit without full diplomatic immunity. Unlike an ambassador, who serves as the single representative of one government to another, a state may appoint several consuls in a foreign nation, typically in major cities; consuls are usually tasked with providing assistance in bureaucratic issues to both citizens of their own country traveling or living abroad and to the citizens of the country in which the consul resides who wish to travel to or trade with the consul's country.

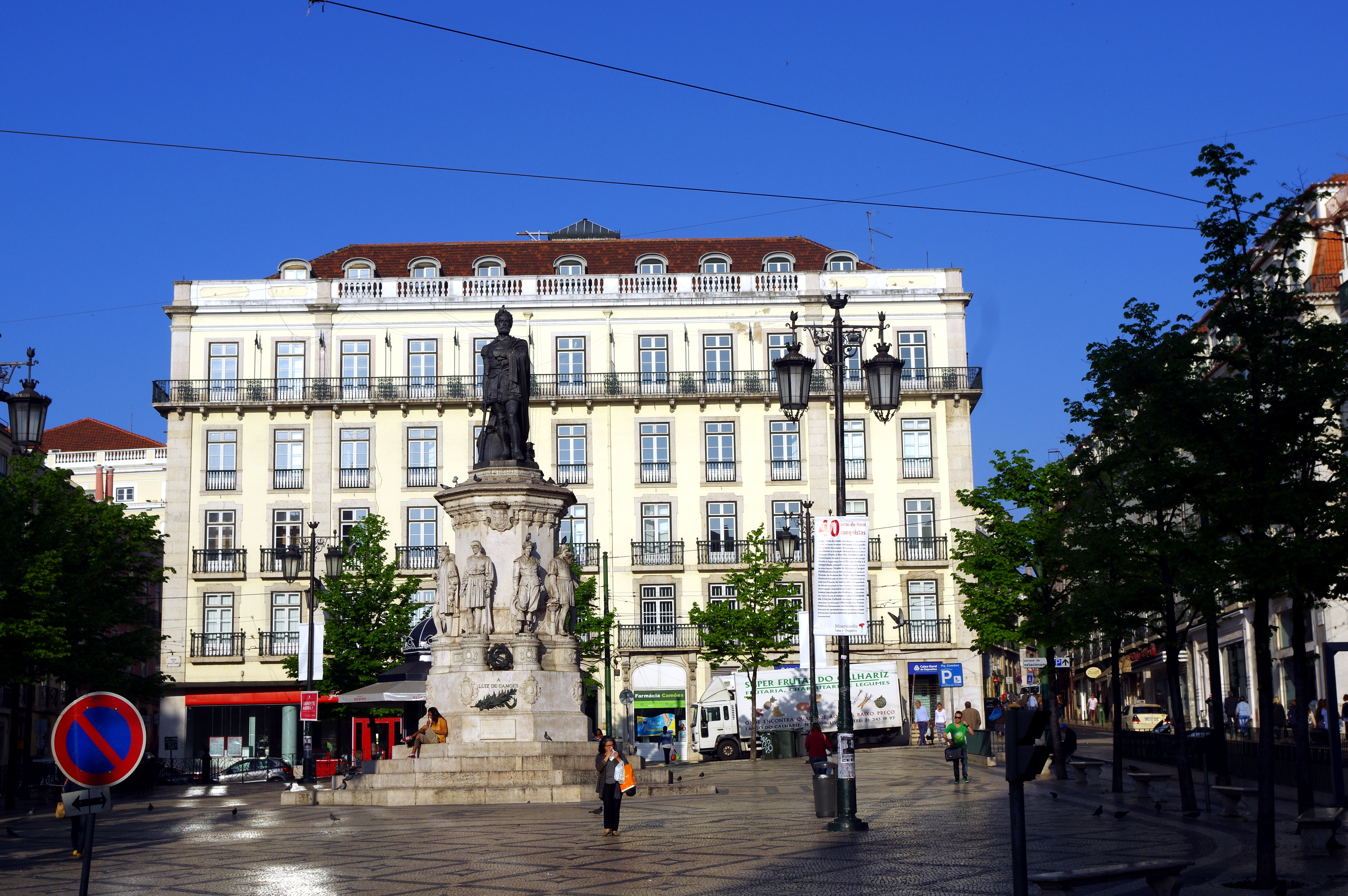
This building on Luís de Camões Square in Lisbon, Portugal, was the site of the Consulate-General of Brazil for more than a century.

== Origin and history ==
=== Antecedent: the classical Greek proxenos ===
In classical Greece, some functions of a modern consul were fulfilled by a proxenos, a citizen (chosen by the city) who hosted foreign ambassadors at his own expense, in return for honorary titles from the state. Unlike a modern diplomat who typically resides in a foreign country, the host proxenos was a citizen of the local polity (in Greece, a city-state). The proxenos was usually a wealthy merchant who had socioeconomic ties to a foreign city, and who helped its citizens when they were in trouble in his home city. The position of proxenos was often hereditary within a particular family. In the modern day, honorary consuls can fulfill a similar function to that of the ancient Greek institution.

=== Historical development of the term ===
Consuls were the highest magistrates of the Roman Republic and Roman Empire. The term was revived by the Republic of Genoa, which, unlike Rome, bestowed it on various state officials, not necessarily restricted to the highest. Among these were Genoese officials stationed in various Mediterranean ports, whose role included duties similar to those of the modern consul (i.e., helping Genoese merchants and sailors in difficulties with the local authorities).

The consolat de mar was an institution established under the reign of Peter IV of Aragon in the fourteenth century, and spread to 47 locations throughout the Mediterranean. It was primarily a judicial body, administering maritime and commercial law as lex mercatoria. Although the consolat de mar was established by the Cortes of Aragon, the consuls were independent from the King. This distinction between consular and diplomatic functions remains (at least formally) to this day. Modern consuls retain limited judicial powers to settle disputes on ships from their country (notably regarding the payment of wages to sailors).

The consulado de mercaderes was set up in 1543 in Seville as a merchant guild to control trade with Latin America. As such, it had branches in the principal cities of the Spanish colonies.

The connection of "consul" with trade and commercial law is retained in French. In Francophone countries, a juge consulaire (consular judge) is a non-professional judge elected by the chamber of commerce to settle commercial disputes in the first instance (in France, sitting in panels of three; in Belgium, in conjunction with a professional magistrate).

=== Lübeck ===
In the social life of 19th-century Lübeck as depicted in Thomas Mann's novel Buddenbrooks – based on Mann's thorough personal knowledge of his own birthplace – an appointment as the consul of a foreign country was a source of considerable social prestige among the city's merchant elite. As depicted in the book, the position of a consul for a particular country was in practice hereditary in a specific family, whose mansion bore the represented country's coat of arms, and with that country confirming the consul's son or other heir in the position on the death of the previous consul. As repeatedly referenced by Mann, a consul's wife was known as "Konsulin" and continued to bear that title even on the death of her husband. Characters in the book are mentioned as consuls for Denmark, the Netherlands and Portugal.

== Role and duties ==
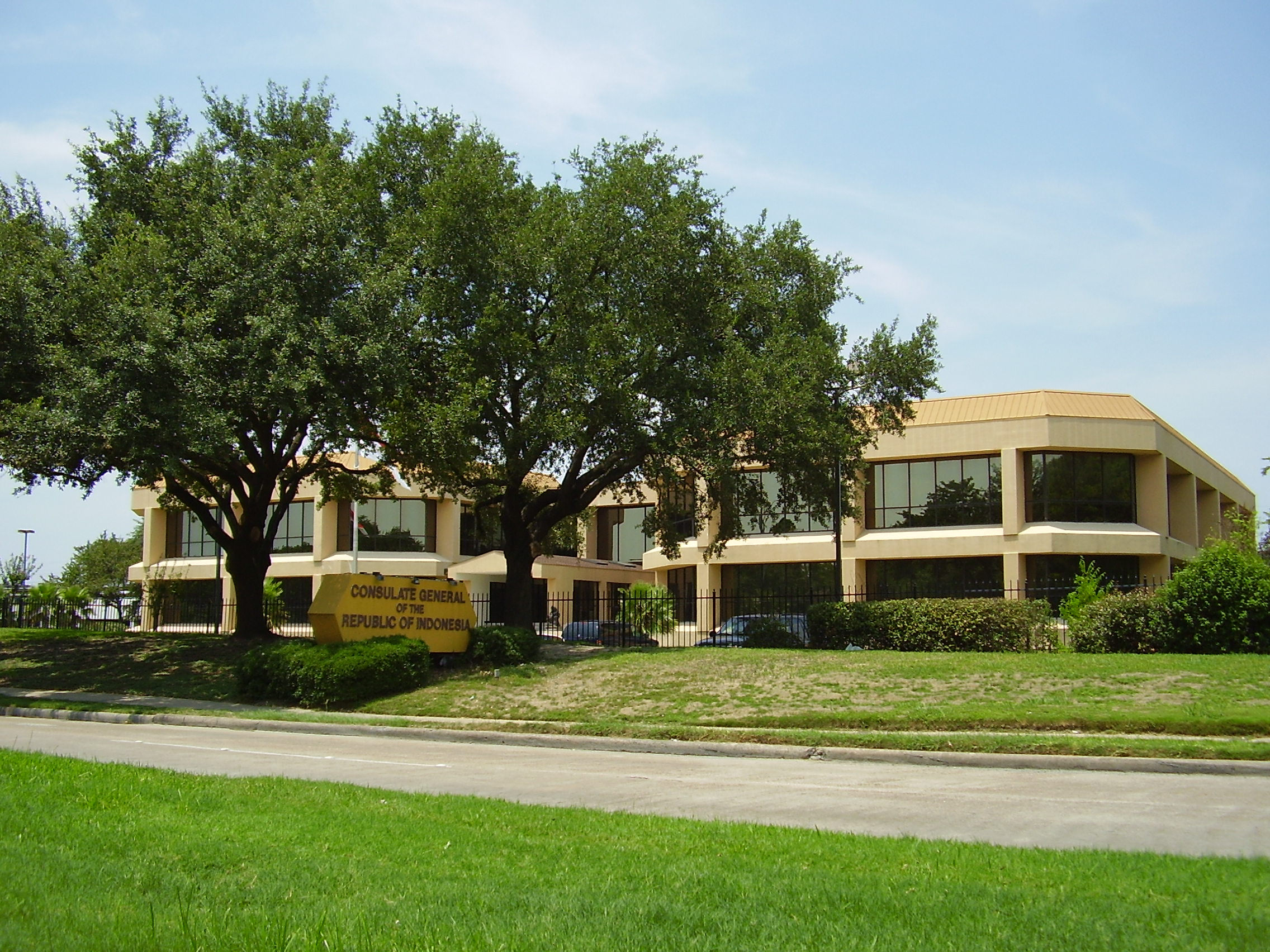
Consulate-General of Indonesia in Houston is Indonesia's representation in Houston, Texas, United States.

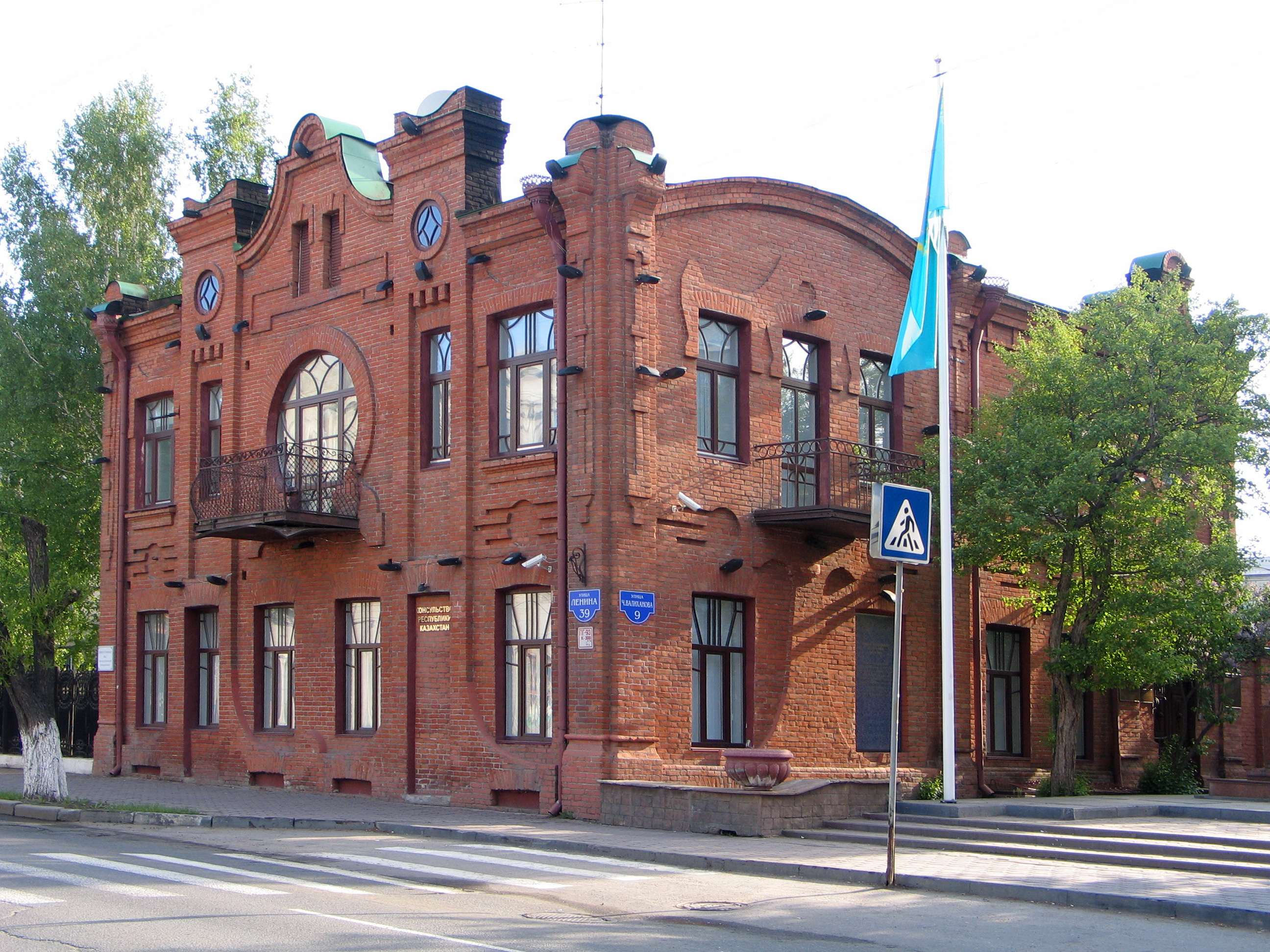
Consulate of Kazakhstan in Omsk, Russia

The office of a consul is a consulate and is usually subordinate to the state's main representation in the capital of that foreign country (host state), usually an embassy or – between Commonwealth countries – high commission. Like the terms embassy or high commission, consulate may refer not only to the office of consul, but also to the building occupied by the consul and their staff. The consulate may share premises with the embassy itself.

=== Consular rank ===
A consul of the highest rank is termed a consul-general and is appointed to a consulate-general. There is typically one or more deputy consuls-general, consuls, vice-consuls, and consular agents working under the consul-general. A country may appoint more than one consul-general to another nation.

A consul general (CG) (plural: consuls general) is an official who heads a consulate general and is a consul of the highest rank serving at a particular location. A consul general may also be responsible for consular districts which contain other, subordinate consular offices within a country. The consul general serves as a representative of their state in the country where they are located, although ultimate jurisdiction over the right to speak on behalf of a home country within another country belongs to the single ambassador.

Another definition is the leader of the consular section of an embassy. This consul general is a diplomat and a member of the ambassador's country team.

=== Authority and activities ===
Consuls of various ranks may have specific legal authority for certain activities, such as notarizing documents. As such, diplomatic personnel with other responsibilities may receive consular letters patent (commissions). Aside from those outlined in the Vienna Convention on Diplomatic Relations, there are few formal requirements outlining what a consular official must do. For example, for some countries, consular officials may be responsible for the issue of visas; other countries may limit "consular services" to providing assistance to compatriots, legalization of documents, etc. Nonetheless, consulates proper will be headed by consuls of various ranks, even if such officials have little or no connection with the more limited sense of consular service.

Activities of a consulate include protecting the interests of their citizens temporarily or permanently residing in the host country, issuing passports; issuing visas to foreigners, and public diplomacy. Although it is not admitted publicly, consulates, like embassies, may also gather intelligence information from the assigned country.

==== Consular districts ====
Contrary to popular belief, many of the staff of consulates may be career diplomats, but they do not generally have diplomatic immunity unless they are also accredited as such. Immunities and privileges for consuls and accredited staff of consulates (consular immunity) are generally limited to actions undertaken in their official capacity and, with respect to the consulate itself, to those required for official duties. In practice, the extension and application of consular privileges and immunities can differ widely from country to country.

Consulates are more numerous than diplomatic missions, such as embassies. Ambassadors are posted only in a foreign nation's capital (but exceptionally outside the country, as in the case of a multiple mandate, e.g., a minor power may accredit a single ambassador with several neighbouring states of modest relative importance that are not considered important allies).

Consuls are posted in a nation's capital, and in other cities throughout that country, especially centres of economic activity and cities with large populations of expatriates. In the United States for example, most countries have a consulate-general in New York City (the home of the United Nations), and some have consulates-general in other major cities.

Consulates are subordinate posts of their home country's diplomatic mission (typically an embassy, in the capital city of the host country). Diplomatic missions are established in international law under the Vienna Convention on Diplomatic Relations, while consulates-general and consulates are established in international law under the Vienna Convention on Consular Relations. Formally, at least within the US system, the consular career (ranking in descending order: consul-general, consul, vice-consul, honorary consul) forms a different hierarchy from the diplomats in the strict sense. However, it is common for individuals to be transferred from one hierarchy to the other, and for consular officials to serve in a capital carrying out strictly consular duties within the consular section of a diplomatic post, e.g., within an embassy.

Between Commonwealth countries, both diplomatic and consular activities may be undertaken by a High Commission in the capital, although larger Commonwealth nations generally also have consulates and consulates-general in major cities. For example, Toronto, Sydney and Auckland are of greater economic importance than their respective national capitals, hence the need for consulates there.

==== Hong Kong ====
When Hong Kong was under British administration, diplomatic missions of Commonwealth countries, such as Canada, Australia, New Zealand, India, Malaysia, and Singapore were known as commissions. After the handover to China in 1997, they were renamed consulates-general, with the last commissioner becoming consul-general. However, the Australian commission had been renamed the consulate-general in 1986.

Owing to Hong Kong's status as a special administrative region of China, some countries' consulates-general in Hong Kong report directly to their respective foreign ministries, rather than to their embassies in Beijing, such as those of Canada, the United Kingdom and the United States.

== Honorary consul ==
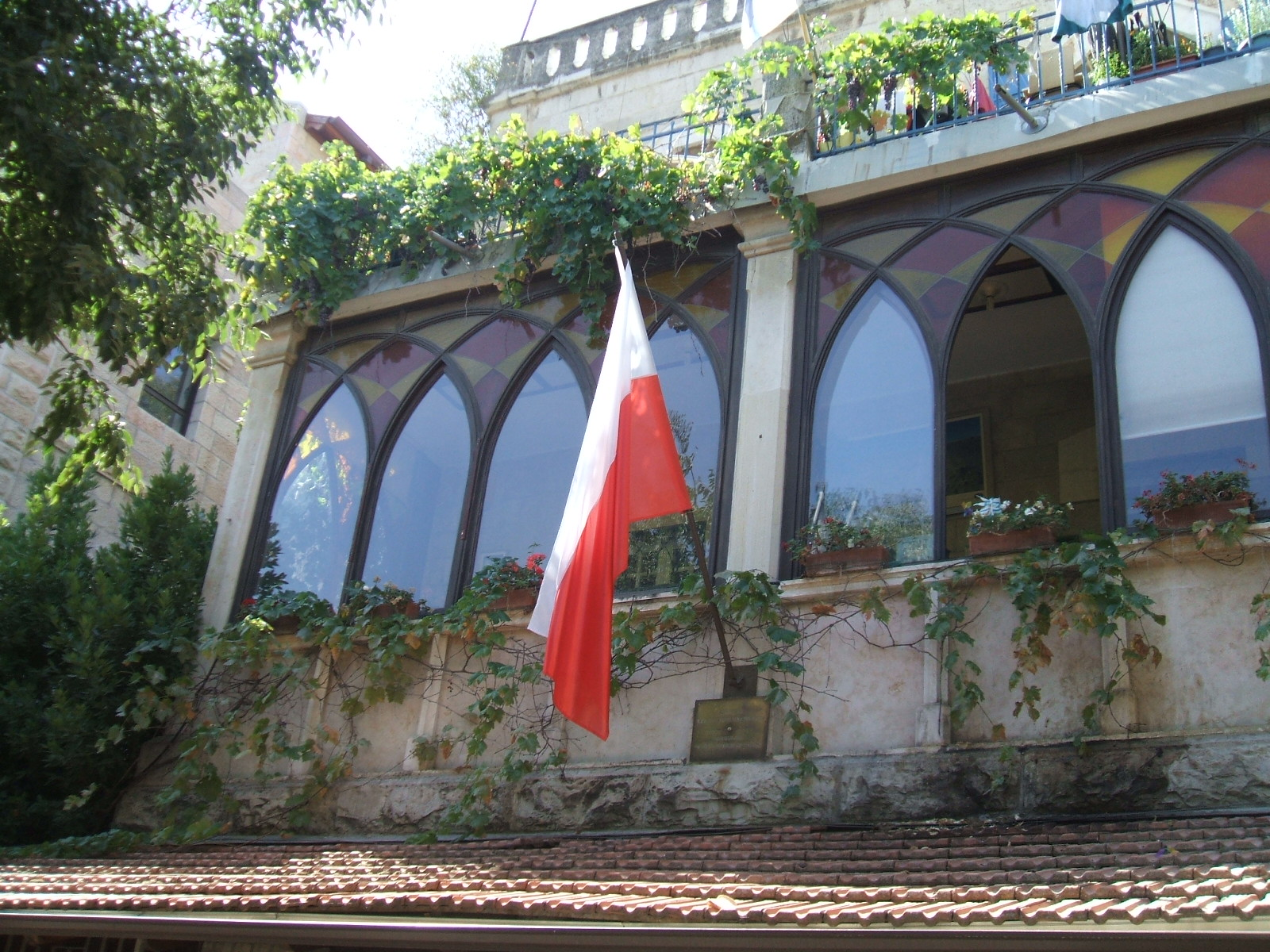
Honorary consulate of Poland in Jerusalem

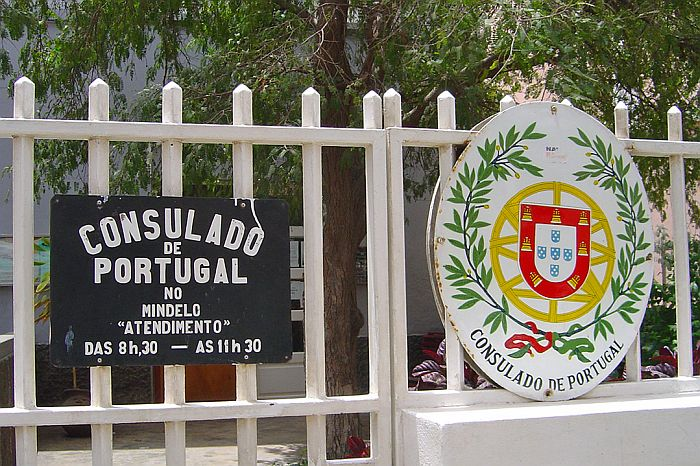
Honorary consulate of Portugal in Mindelo, Cape Verde

Some consuls are not career officials of the represented state. They may be local people with the nationality of the sending country, and in smaller cities, or in cities that are very distant from full-time diplomatic missions, a foreign government which feels that some form of representation is nevertheless desirable may appoint a person who has not hitherto been part of their diplomatic service to fulfill this role. Such a consul may well combine the job with their own (often commercial) private activities, and in some instances may not even be a citizen of the sending country. Such consular appointments are usually given the title of honorary consul or consul ad honorem.

Such hosting and appointing varies from nation to nation, with some doing both, one or the other, or neither. The transparency also varies, with some nation-states not even including such information on the websites of their foreign ministries. Furthermore, some do not use the honorary consul system at all.

The United States of America limits whom it will recognise as honorary consuls and grants only some limited rights. (Note: The U.S. Secretary of State (in memos issued on 6 August 2003 and 5 February 2014) stated the following concerning honorary consuls in the United States: The United States Government appreciates that honorary consular officers provide important services both to the governments which they represent and to United States citizens and entities. Nevertheless, for reasons previously communicated to the missions, United States Government policy requires that the maintenance and establishment of consular posts headed by honorary consular officers must be supported by documentation which makes it possible for the Department of State to be assured that meaningful consular functions will be exercised by honorary consular officers on a regular basis and that such consular officers come under the supervision of, and are accountable to, the governments which they represent. As a matter of U.S. policy, honorary consular officers recognized by the U.S. Government are American citizens, or permanent resident aliens who perform consular services on a part-time basis. The limited immunity afforded honorary consular officers is specified in Article 71 of the Vienna Convention on Consular Relations (VCCR). Such individuals do not enjoy personal inviolability, and may be arrested pending trial if circumstances should otherwise warrant. However, appropriate steps are provided to accord to such officers the protection required by virtue of their official position. In addition, the consular archives and documents of a consular post headed by an honorary consular officer are inviolable at all times, and wherever they may be, provided they are kept separate from other papers and documents of a private or commercial nature relating to other activities of an honorary consular officer or persons working with that consular officer.) In some cases "accused terror financiers, arms traffickers and drug runners" have misused their position as honorary consuls.

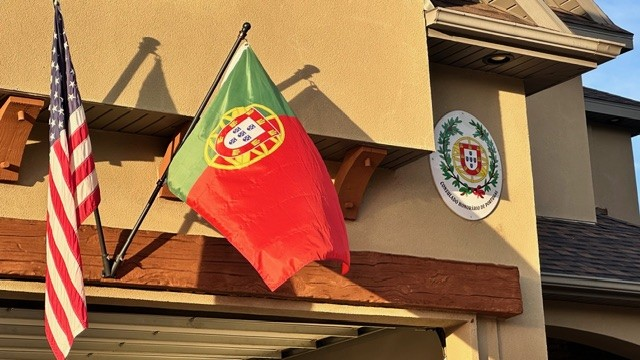
Honorary Consulate of Portugal in Utah, USA

Despite their other roles, honorary consular officers (in the widest use of the term) in some instances also have responsibility for the welfare of citizens of the appointing country within their bailiwick. For example, the Embassy of Finland states that the tasks of Finland's Honorary Consulate include monitoring the rights of Finns and permanent residents of Finland residing in the area in which the consulate is located, providing advice and guidance for distressed Finnish citizens and permanent residents traveling abroad to that area, and assisting them in their contacts with local authorities or the nearest Finnish embassy or consulate. Certain types of notarized certificates can be acquired through an honorary consul. Together with diplomatic missions, an honorary consul promotes economic and cultural relations between Finland and the country in question and takes part in strengthening Finland's image abroad. An honorary consul can advise Finnish companies, for instance, in obtaining information about local business culture and in finding cooperation partners. Over the years, Honorary Consulates have assumed growing importance particularly for Low and Middle Income Countries and for countries looking at cutting costs and has emerged as a powerful diplomatic pillar of strength.

== See also ==
- Administrative consul
- Agent general
- Capitulation (treaty)
- Consul
- Consular corps
- Diplomacy
