= WooYun =

Defunct Chinese vulnerability disclosure platform

- Website type: Vulnerability forum
- Dissolved: July 20, 2016
- Founders: Meng De; Fang Xiaodun
- Website: www.wooyun.org

The WooYun (Chinese: 乌云网; lit. 'dark cloud') was a Mainland China-based vulnerability disclosure platform founded in May 2010 by Fang Xiaodun and Meng De. It posted an announcement on July 20, 2016, that the site was down for an upgrade and would be restored in the shortest possible time. However, as of April 12, 2021, the website remains inaccessible.

WooYun touted itself as a "free and equal platform for reporting vulnerabilities". The Wooyun.org domain name was registered on May 6, 2010.

== Legal incidents ==
=== Jiayuan and Yuan Wei ===
A white hat by the name of Yuan Wei ("YW") submitted an SQL vulnerability to Jiayuan.com in December 2015. Jiayuan fixed the issue and publicly thanked YW, but reported him for alleged theft of more than 900 rows of personal information in January 2016. The suspect was taken into custody in April while maintaining his innocence, explaining the access as caused by the sqlmap program.

=== Shutdown ===
On the evening of July 19, 2016, someone broke the news that all the senior managements of WooYun were taken away by the police.

The Wall Street Journal said it was unclear whether the Chinese government shut it down or its organizers did.

iThome.com.tw speculated that the most likely reason for the shutdown of WooYun was that hackers on the platform exposed a vulnerability in the system of China's United Front Work Department, which had leaked Chinese state secrets and stepped on the bottom line of the Chinese government.

== See also ==
- Bug bounty program
- White hat (computer security)
