= Jarl Lindfors =

Finnish diplomat

Jarl Lindfors served as Honorary Consul of Finland in the United States from 1936–1960.

== Early life ==
Jarl Lindfors was born in Helsinki, Finland in 1887. In 1893, his father, Jarl Arthur Valdemar Lindfors, a music director, who studied under Jean Sibelius, and his mother, Aina Aurora Alvina Lindfors, née Söderberg, moved to Hämeenlinna with their six children, and Lindfors enrolled in the Hämeenlinnan Lyseo. Because of dire economic conditions in Finland in 1904, Lindfors answered the call of the sea at the age of seventeen, in order to contribute to the support of his parents and five sisters. He sailed aboard Norwegian four-masters and American merchant ships until 1908.

== Life in the United States ==
In 1908, in San Francisco, he joined the United States Revenue Cutter Service and sailed aboard the revenue cutter "Bear", the most revered ship of what today is the United States Coast Guard. He sailed on the "Bear" until 1914, with intervening periods of service in the United States Merchant Marine. Lindfors then joined the United States Life Saving Service as a surfman, and was stationed on the beach at Pt. Reyes, California.

He resumed his career in the U.S. Merchant Marine in 1917 and sailed on its ships throughout the world until 1921. After passing a series of examinations, he qualified as Chief Officer.

== Personal life ==
During a visit at the Consulate General of Finland in New York City, he met Kerttu Bloomquist, who was employed there as a secretary. In 1921, Lindfors married Kerttu and gave up his maritime career. Over the course of the next decade, they had three children together: Kirsti, Pertti, and Hilkka.

== Work as an Honorary Consul of Finland ==
In 1921, Lindfors was appointed honorary Vice Consul of Finland in San Francisco, with a vast consular district, consisting of the states of California, Nevada, Arizona, Utah, Colorado, New Mexico, Hawaii and all American possessions in the Pacific. He was promoted to the grade of Consul in Finland's Honorary Consulate in 1936. He served as the only Finnish consular officer in California from 1921 to 1942, when, because of World War II, diplomatic relations between Finland and the United States were severed, and all Finnish consular offices in the United States were closed.

During the time that Lindfors served as Consul, many Finnish immigrants were of limited education. Some lacked a basic knowledge of English. They were primarily seamen, miners, carpenters, fishermen and loggers, who turned to Consul Lindfors for assistance in obtaining passports and visas; drafting and presenting their petitions for United States citizenship; transferring funds to Finland in their behalf; and translating Finnish documents into English. He promoted trade relations between the United States and the western states; provided information services regarding Finland; and generally protected Finnish interests within his vast consular district.

Over the years, Lindfors represented hundreds of Finnish beneficiaries of decedents' estates. The funds distributed from these estates to him, as representative of beneficiaries residing in Finland, amounted to hundreds of thousands of dollars. The funds were transmitted by him to the Consulate General in New York, which, in turn, distributed them to the beneficiaries in Finland, in the form of Finnish marks.

During World War II, Lindfors became active in the Finnish Relief organization, headed by President Herbert Hoover, as honorary chairman. During the Winter War (1939-1940), he participated in at least fifty five events in Northern California to plead for assistance to Finnish Relief. The most significant event was a track meet held at the Civic Auditorium in San Francisco in March 1940 when Paavo Nurmi and Taisto Mäki competed against local talent. Lindfors also assisted Gunnar Barlund, Finland's best ever professional boxer, in his match in San Francisco for Finnish Relief.

In 1942, the United States severed diplomatic relations with Finland and the Secretary of State, Cordell Hull, commanded that the consular office be dismantled. After closing the office, Lindfors resumed his maritime career with the Matson Navigation Company and served until the end of World War II.

After the war, diplomatic relations between the United States and Finland were resumed, and, in 1947, Lindfors was reappointed honorary Consul of Finland. During this period of rapprochement, he received numerous visiting Finnish scholars, artists and businessmen and assisted them in promoting the Finnish brand. He assisted the Finnish team at the 1960 Winter Olympics in Squaw Valley, with fund raising, transportation and accommodations.

Lindfors served as honorary Consul of Finland until 1960, when the Finnish government established a career Consulate General in San Francisco.

== Awards ==
In recognition of his services, the President of Finland conferred upon Jarl Lindfors the Order of the White Rose of Finland, Second Class in 1927; the Order of the Lion of Finland, First Class in 1948 and the Order of the White Rose of Finland, First Class in 1960.

== Death ==
Jarl Lindfors died in 1968 in Walnut Creek, California.
