= Bank guarantee =

Financial guarantee from a lender

A bank guarantee is a kind of guarantee from a lending organization. The bank guarantee also signifies that the lending institution ensures that the liabilities of a debtor are going to be met. In other words, if the debtor fails to perform the obligation, the bank will cover it. A bank guarantee allows the customer, or debtor, to acquire goods, purchase equipment or draw down a loan. A bank guarantee is a promise from a bank or other lending institution that if a particular borrower defaults, the bank will cover the loss. A bank guarantee is similar to, but not the same as a letter of credit.

== Use in trade and project finance ==
Bank guarantees are widely used in commercial transactions to secure payment or performance obligations. The U.S. International Trade Administration notes that, in export finance, foreign buyers often provide a bank guarantee in the form of an aval, letter of guarantee, or letter of credit.

In international practice, guarantees are also used in construction, infrastructure, and other project-based transactions to support bid, advance-payment, and performance obligations. The International Chamber of Commerce states that demand guarantees secure monetary and performance obligations in a wide array of international and domestic contracts.
