= Ecava =

Malaysian software company

Ecava Sdn Bhd
- Company type: Private
- Industry: Industrial automation
- Founded: 2005; 21 years ago
- Headquarters: Selangor, Malaysia
- Website: Ecava.com

Ecava is a Malaysian company specializing in HMI / SCADA software. Founded in 2005, Ecava is a Private limited company headquartered in Selangor, Malaysia.

== Products and Services ==
Ecava develops and distributes IntegraXor SCADA and Kioskit software. Ecava also provides engineering development and services for the industrial automation and control system industry.
