= Del credere =

A del credere commission is a commission which is paid as direct commission instead of paying through someone else. Del Crede commission is that of a surety who is liable to the principal should the purchaser make default. The agreement between agent and principal need not be reduced to or evidenced by writing, for the undertaking is not a guarantee within the Statute of Frauds (29 Cha. 2. c. 3).

A Del Credere Agent not only establishes a privity of contract between the principal and the third party but also guarantees to the principal the due performance of the contract by the third party. The agent is liable, however, only when the third party fails to carry out their contract, e.g., by insolvency. The agent is not liable to the principal if the third party refuses to carry out the contract, for example if the buyer refuses to take delivery.

In the case of United States v. Masonite Corp., 316 U.S. 265 (1942), the U.S. Supreme Court evaluated the antitrust status of use of a del credere agency business structure. Such an arrangement often may, as it did in the Masonite case, involve the principal's fixing the price at which the agent sells the goods that the principal supplies it. The Supreme Court held that, although the parties’ agency agreement could be assumed genuine rather than sham, use of del credere agency does not necessarily insulate the firms from antitrust liability.

The Court observed that the label the parties used for their agreement was not significant, because the Court “has quite consistently refused to allow the form into which the parties chose to cast the transaction to govern.” Id. at 278. Moreover, although the contract may be useful “in allocating risks between the parties and determining their rights inter se, its terms do not necessarily control when the rights of others intervene,” such as those of creditors or the public. Id. at 276–77. Because the arrangement had the purpose of fixing competitors’ prices it was held illegal under Sherman Act § 1. The holding in Masonite thus seems to overrule partially the Supreme Court's earlier holding in United States v. General Electric Co., 272 U.S. 476 (1926).
