= OrangeHRM =

American software company

- Type: Private
- Industry: HR Software
- Founded: 2005; 21 years ago
- Founder: Sujee Saparamadu
- Headquarters: Secaucus, New Jersey
- Key people: Sujee Saparamadu (CEO 2005 - present)
- Products: OrangeHRM Starter OrangeHRM Advanced
- Number of employees: 100+
- Website: orangehrm.com

OrangeHRM Inc. is an HR software company based in Secaucus, New Jersey which develops a human resource management system. OrangeHRM offers an open source starter version and a paid version. The company was founded by Sujee Saparamadu in 2005.

== History ==
Founder and CEO of OrangeHRM Sujee Saparamadu, started OrangeHRM in 2005 with four employees 2. Early development. OrangeHRM 1.0 was a free and open source version released to SourceForge in March 2006. 1.0 comprised features such as employee information management, employee self-service, and reporting.

In 2010 OrangeHRM received a Series A investment from principal investors Larry Stefonic and David Axmark. David Axmark is also a co-founder of MySQL AB and a developer of the free database server, MySQL, is on the board of directors.

== Products ==
=== Packages ===
- OrangeHRM Starter - Open Source Version
- OrangeHRM Advanced (30 Day Free Trial)

OrangeHRM Core Solutions and Modules

- Compensation
  - Leave Management
  - Time and Attendance
  - Roster
- People Management
  - HR Administration
  - Employee Management
  - Reporting and Analytics
  - Mobile App
- Talent Management
  - Recruitment
  - Onboarding
  - Request Desk
- Culture
  - Performance Management
  - Career Development
  - Training
  - Surveys
  - Employee Voice
  - Discipline
