= IntegraXor =

- Developer: Ecava
- Release: 2003
- Stable release: V8.0 / 2019-01-03
- Operating system: Microsoft Windows
- Type: SCADA
- Website: ECAVA IntegraXor

IntegraXor is a supervisory control and data acquisition (SCADA) and human-machine interface (HMI) software system developed by Ecava and first released in 2003.

== Function ==
As a commercial web SCADA system, it is used by engineers as a tool to develop and customize web-based SCADA applications.

== Security ==
Security researchers have found numerous vulnerabilities including a Zero Day vulnerability where major manufacturers and industrial companies in the UK, US and over 30 other countries are being urged to adopt a rapidly-released fix by IntegraXor. The United States Department of Homeland Security (DHS) Industrial Control Systems Cyber Emergency Response Team (ICS-CERT) itself discovered vulnerabilities in IntegraXor.

In 2013, Ecava released the first known bug bounty program for ICS. However, they received a backlash for offering store credits instead of cash which does not incentivize security researchers.
