= Service guarantee =

A service guarantee is a marketing tool service firms have increasingly been using to reduce consumer risk perceptions, signal quality, differentiate a service offering, and to institutionalize and professionalize their internal management of customer complaint and service recovery. By delivering service guarantees, companies entitle customers with one or more forms of compensation, namely easy-to-claim replacement, refund or credit, under the circumstances of service delivery failure. Conditions are often put on these compensations; however, some companies provide them unconditionally.

== Benefits ==
According to Christopher Hart, service guarantees provide the following powerful platforms for promoting and accomplish service quality:

- By delivering service guarantees, firms are forced to focus on customers' want and expectation in every aspect of the service.
- Guarantees establish clear standards which create a common image of what the company stands for in both customers and employees' mind. Managers are motivated to seriously concern service guarantees, because they emphasize the financial expenditure of quality failures.
- With service guarantees, firms are required to build effective systems to generate meaningful customer feedback and develop corresponding courses of action.
- Guarantees require service organizations to understand reasons of failure and motivate them to identify and manage potential fail points
- Guarantees help customers to reduce risk in making purchase decisions and to reinforce their long-term loyalty.

For customers, service guarantees play an important role in alleviating perceived risks of the purchase. The guarantees also facilitate more ease and more likelihood for customers to complain, since they expect the front-line staff to be ready with resolutions and appropriate compensations. From companies' perspectives, according to the vice President of Hampton Inn, "Designing the guarantee made us understand what made guests satisfied, rather than what we thought made them satisfied."

== Design ==
While no conditions are imposed on some guarantees, others have apparently been drafted by lawyers and cover many restrictions. Christopher Hart states that the following criteria should be met in designing service guarantees:

- Unconditional: Promises of the guarantees must be unconditional and no elements of surprise should be made to customers
- Comprehensible: The guarantees must be easy to understand and communicate so that customers can have clear awareness of the benefits of the guarantees.
- Meaningful: Firms must make the guarantee important to the customers and provide adequate values to offset service failure.
- Easy to invoke: The guarantee should be less dependent on the customer and more on service provider.
- Easy to collect: Service providers should design an easy and problem-free guarantees collection process for customers.
- Credible: Guarantees must be offered in a believable manner.

== Types ==
TERM	GUARANTEE SCOPE	EXAMPLE
Single-attribute specific guarantee	One key attribute of the service is covered by the guarantee	"Any of three specified popular pizzas is guaranteed to be served within 10 minutes of ordering on working days between 12 A.M. and 2 P.M. If the pizza is late, the customer's next order is free.
Multi-attribute specific guarantee	A few important attributes of the service are covered by the guarantee.	Minneapolis Marriott's guarantee: "Our quality commitment to you is to provide: A friendly, efficient check-in; A clean, comfortable room, where everything works; A friendly, efficient check-out; If we, in your opinion, do not deliver on this commitment, we will give you $20 in cash. No question asked. It is your interpretation."
Full-satisfaction guarantee	All aspects of the service are covered by the guarantee. There are no exceptions.	Lands' End's guarantee: " If you are not completely satisfied with any item you buy from us, at any time during your use of it, return it and we will refund your full purchase price. We mean every word of it. Whatever. Whenever. Always. But to make sure this is perfectly clear, we've decided to simplify it further. GUARANTEED. Period."
Combined guarantee	All aspects of the service are covered by the full-satisfaction promise of the guarantee. Explicit minimum performance standards on important attributes are included in the guarantee to reduce uncertainty.	Datapro Information Services guarantees "to deliver the report on time, to high quality standards, and to the contents outlined in this proposal. Should we fail to deliver according to this guarantee, or should you be dissatisfied with any aspect of our work, you can deduct any amount from the final payment which is deemed as fair."

== Managerial implications ==
According to study by Wirtz (1998), a guarantee can be introduced for many different operations/quality and marketing objectives. A company with poor quality may want to focus primarily on causes of existing quality gaps, whereas a firm with high quality standards but limited market presence and quality reputation may want to focus mainly on transforming potential customers into loyal ones.
Additionally, the impact of an explicit guarantee on purchase intent was strong for the good quality provider, but there was no change in the purchase intent for the outstanding provider. There are two plausible reasons for this. First, purchase intent was already high for the outstanding provider; hence it might have been difficult to boost the ratings much further. Second, the outstanding provider might have already captured the high-end of the market, even when it did not offer an explicit guarantee. Thus, the impact of providing an explicit guarantee would be minimal and it would be difficult for, for example, a highly rated hotel to attract new customers by signaling higher quality.

== Considerations in the introduction of service guarantees ==
Companies should conduct careful analysis about their strengths and weaknesses in the decision of introducing service guarantees. For service providers whose reputations have been strongly established, guarantees may not be necessary since they might be incongruent with their image and might create confusion in the market. On the contrary, firms which are experiencing poor service delivery must improve their quality to the level where customers invoke guarantees on a more regular basis.
In addition, service guarantees are not necessary for companies whose quality is beyond control in the presence of external factors. When realizing that there was a lack of control over its railroad infrastructure, Amtrak decided to drop a service guarantee that included the reimbursement of train fares in the event of unpunctual service.
Service guarantee is also not necessary in a market in which the perceived financial, personal or physiological risk associated with the service is little. Guarantees will then adds minor values, yet still take time and money costs to design, implement and manage. In the case where customers perceive little difference between service quality between competing firms, the first firm introducing service guarantees will be able obtain first mover-advantages and differentiate its service from the others. However, if many competitors have already employed service guarantees, introducing a highly differentiated guarantee beyond the industry's common practice is the only way to generate an impact.

== See also ==
- Guarantee
- Money back guarantee
