= Honorary consulates of Finland =

Honorary Consulates

The Honorary Consulate of Finland is an extension of Finland's diplomatic activities beyond its standard network of embassies and consulates. The honorary consuls are appointed on an honorary basis in line with the Vienna Convention on Consular Relations confirmed by the Ministry of Foreign Affairs of Finland and then subsequently approved by the host government as per the convention.

== Tasks ==
Honorary consuls of Finland:

- Monitor the rights of Finns and permanent residents of Finland in the area in which the consulate is located
- Provide guidance and advice for Finnish citizens or permanent residents traveling abroad to that area
- Provide some notarized certificates
- Promote economic and cultural relations between Finland and the country in which the honorary consulate is located

== List of honorary counsulates ==
=== United States ===
- Boston, Massachusetts
- Anchorage, Alaska
- Atlanta, Georgia
- Baltimore, Maryland
- Birmingham, Alabama
- Charlotte, North Carolina
- Chicago, Illinois
- Dallas, Texas
- Denver, Colorado
- Detroit, Michigan
- Hancock, Michigan
- Honolulu, Hawaii
- Houston, Texas
- Lake Worth, Florida
- Miami, Florida
- Minneapolis, Minnesota
- New Orleans, Louisiana
- Newark, New Jersey
- Norfolk, Virginia
- Norwich, Connecticut
- Philadelphia, Pennsylvania
- Phoenix, Arizona
- Portland, Oregon
- Salt Lake City, Utah
- San Diego, California
- San Francisco, California
- Seattle, Washington
- St. Louis, Missouri
- Virginia, Minnesota

=== Sweden ===
- Borlänge
- Karlskoga
- Karlstad
- Västerås

=== Canada ===
- Calgary
- Halifax, Nova Scotia
- Montreal
- Saint John, New Brunswick
- Saskatoon
- Sault Ste. Marie, Ontario
- Sudbury, Ontario
- Thunder Bay
- Toronto
- Vancouver
- Winnipeg

== Past and present honorary consuls ==
- Andy Bingham, Salt Lake City
- Hanna Eklund, Anchorage
- Jon Jurva, Chicago
- Leonard Kopelman, Boston
- Jarl Lindfors, San Francisco
- Pertti Lindfors, San Francisco
- James Kurtti, Hancock, Missouri

== Other sources ==
- "Finnish Honorary Consulates in the U.S."
- "Honorary Consulates".
- "Honorary Consulate of Finland for Utah, Idaho, Montana and Wyoming".
- "Chicago Council on Global Affairs". Archived from the original on December 14, 2012.
