= DB-Engines ranking =

Database management system ranking

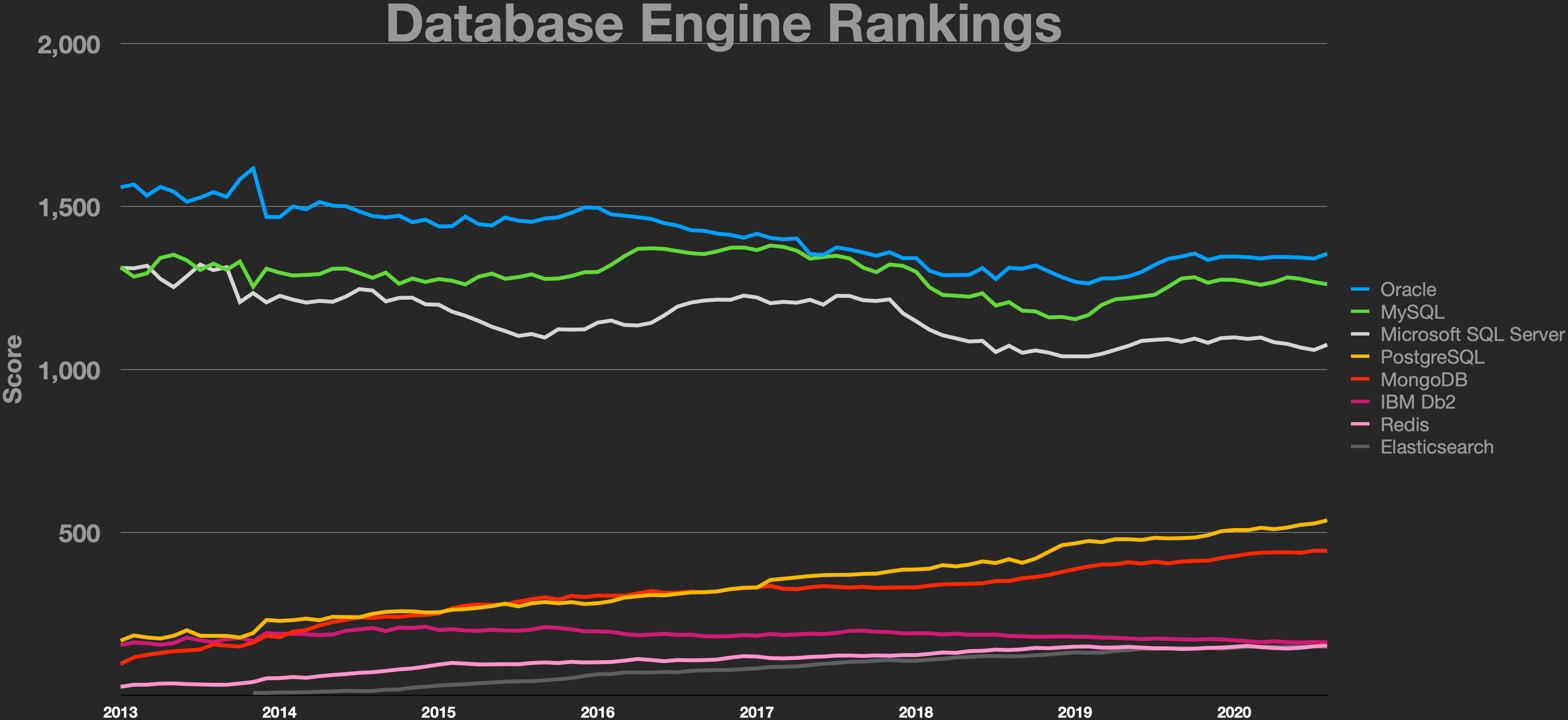
Database Engine Rankings

The DB-Engines Ranking ranks database management systems by popularity, covering over 410 systems. The ranking criteria include number of search engine results when searching for the system names, Google Trends, Stack Overflow discussions, job offers with mentions of the systems, number of profiles in professional networks such as LinkedIn, mentions in social networks such as Twitter. The ranking is updated monthly. It has been described and cited in various database-related articles.

By grouping over specific database features like database model or type of license, regularly published statistics reveal historical trends which are used in strategic statements.

In June 2024, the assets of DB-Engines were bought by Redgate Software. Redgate stated that it would retain the DB-Engines branding and identity and continue to provide trusted and independent monthly database ranking reports.

== History ==
The DB-Engines DBMS portal was created in 2012 and is maintained by the Austrian consulting company Solid IT. Based on its ranking, DB-Engines grants a yearly award for the system that gained most in popularity within a year.

The award winners are:

- 2013 – MongoDB
- 2014 – MongoDB
- 2015 – Oracle
- 2016 – Microsoft SQL Server
- 2017 – PostgreSQL
- 2018 – PostgreSQL
- 2019 – MySQL
- 2020 – PostgreSQL
- 2021 – Snowflake
- 2022 – Snowflake
- 2023 – PostgreSQL
- 2024 – Snowflake

== Methodology ==
The ranking comes from an average of the following parameters after normalization:

1. Number of mentions in search engines queries
  - Google
  - Bing
2. Frequency of searches
  - Google Trends
3. Number of related questions and the number of interested users
  - Stack Overflow
  - DBA Stack Exchange
4. Number of job postings
  - Indeed
  - Simply Hired
5. Number of profiles in professional networks
  - LinkedIn
6. Number of mentions in social networks
  - Twitter

== DB-Engine Ranking list ==
DB-engine ranking list as of July 2026:

1. Oracle Database
2. MySQL
3. Microsoft SQL Server
4. PostgreSQL
5. MongoDB
6. Snowflake
7. Databricks
8. Redis
9. IBM Db2
10. Apache Cassandra
11. SQLite
12. Elasticsearch
13. MariaDB
14. Microsoft Azure SQL Database
15. Splunk
16. Apache Hive
17. Microsoft Access
18. Amazon DynamoDB
19. Google BigQuery
20. Neo4j
21. SAP HANA
22. Apache Solr
23. Teradata
24. FileMaker
25. SAP Adaptive Server
26. ClickHouse
27. Apache Spark
28. PostGIS
29. InfluxDB
30. Microsoft Azure Cosmos DB
31. OpenSearch
32. Apache HBase
33. Microsoft Fabric
34. Firebird
35. Microsoft Azure Synapse Analytics
36. Amazon Redshift
37. Firebase Realtime Database
38. Memcached
39. Informix
40. Apache Flink
41. Apache Impala
42. DuckDB
43. Amazon Aurora
44. Couchbase
45. Prometheus
46. Google Cloud Firestore
47. Pinecone
48. H2
49. Vertica
50. Kdb+
51. dBASE
52. etcd
53. Trino
54. Algolia
55. Milvus
56. Realm
57. Netezza
58. Microsoft Azure AI Search
59. Presto
60. Qdrant
61. Sphinx
62. CouchDB
63. TimescaleDB
64. Greenplum
65. DolphinDB
66. ScyllaDB
67. Weaviate
68. Hazelcast
69. CockroachDB
70. Oracle Essbase
71. Graphite
72. Aerospike
73. Apache Jackrabbit
74. RocksDB
75. MarkLogic
76. Apache Druid
77. Alibaba Cloud PolarDB
78. InterBase
79. TiDB
80. SAP SQL Anywhere
81. Arango
82. Oracle NoSQL Database
83. QuestDB
84. OpenEdge
85. Google Cloud Datastore
86. DataStax Enterprise
87. Ingres
88. Riak KV
89. Azure Data Explorer
90. Chroma
91. Apache Derby
92. SingleStore
93. TDengine
94. Ehcache
95. Google Cloud Spanner
96. Microsoft Azure Table Storage
97. Apache Ignite
98. ADABAS
99. Amazon Neptune
100. GemFire
101. HyperSQL
102. Valkey
103. Apache Accumulo
104. Virtuoso
105. OrientDB
106. Google Cloud Bigtable
107. Apache Jena – TDB
108. GraphDB
109. OceanBase
110. IBM Cloudant
111. SAP IQ
112. Coveo
113. InterSystems IRIS
114. RavenDB
115. RethinkDB
116. Apache IoTDB
117. Citus
118. Apache Phoenix
119. YugabyteDB
120. Rockset
121. GBase
122. 4D
123. CloudKit
124. UniData / UniVerse
125. Stardog
126. Amazon DocumentDB
127. Amazon CloudSearch
128. LMDB
129. Percona Server for MySQL
130. Infinispan
131. LevelDB
132. TigerGraph
133. JanusGraph
134. PouchDB
135. MaxDB
136. Memgraph
137. NebulaGraph
138. SpatiaLite
139. Apache Drill
140. EDB Postgres
141. VictoriaMetrics
142. PlanetScale
143. StarRocks
144. Oracle Coherence
145. Fauna
146. MonetDB
147. IMS
148. Amazon SimpleDB
149. Datomic
150. Oracle Berkeley DB
151. Vitess
152. EXASOL
153. RRDtool
154. GridDB
155. SurrealDB
156. Meilisearch
157. BaseX
158. OpenTSDB
159. D3 (DBMS)
160. jBASE
161. GridGain
162. TDSQL for MySQL
163. Geode
164. HFSQL
165. Tarantool
166. Amazon Timestream
167. Dgraph
168. Empress
169. Actian NoSQL Database
170. VoltDB
171. Apache Kylin
172. ObjectBox
173. Arc
174. Typesense
175. Mnesia
176. Db4o
177. HEAVY.AI
178. IBM Db2 Warehouse
179. LiteDB
180. Amazon Keyspaces
181. ObjectStore
182. FoundationDB
183. Tibero
184. openGauss
185. TimesTen
186. Datameer
187. SQLBase
188. KurrentDB (EventStoreDB)
189. Giraph
190. Alibaba Cloud MaxCompute
191. Dolt
192. NonStop SQL
193. Vespa
194. Xapian
195. GT.M
196. GigaSpaces
197. DataEase
198. mSQL
199. M3DB
200. Apache HAWQ
201. Oracle Rdb
202. NCache
203. CUBRID
204. Alibaba AnalyticDB for MySQL
205. IDMS
206. Sedna
207. Altibase
208. HPE Ezmeral Data Fabric
209. RisingWave
210. NuoDB
211. KeyDB
212. GeoMesa
213. AllegroGraph
214. Yellowbrick
215. Blazegraph
216. ZODB
217. Infobright
218. BigchainDB
219. Model 204
220. Apache Sedona
221. MatrixOne
222. Actian Vector
223. SciDB
224. RDF4J
225. Graph Engine
226. eXist-db
227. Alibaba AnalyticDB for PostgreSQL
228. Datacom/DB
229. TypeDB
230. Kinetica
231. CrateDB
232. R:BASE
233. SQream DB
234. Firebolt
235. Apache Pinot
236. DragonflyDB
237. BoltDB
238. Objectivity/DB
239. Splice Machine
240. DBISAM
241. 1010data
242. SolidDB
243. ObjectDB
244. Perst
245. KairosDB
246. Percona Server for MongoDB
247. Northgate Reality
248. ITTIA
249. Scalaris
250. Alibaba Cloud Log Service
251. Atoti
252. NexusDB
253. FrontBase
254. eXtremeDB
255. Kyligence Enterprise
256. ScaleArc
257. SQL.js
258. WebSphere eXtreme Scale
259. YDB
260. MapDB
261. Kingbase
262. Cloudflare Workers KV
263. OpenInsight
264. Deep Lake
265. GemStone/S
266. Elassandra
267. Apache Doris
268. Alibaba Cloud TSDB
269. Hibari
270. RaptorDB
271. Comdb2
272. Marqo
273. Harper
274. CnosDB
275. VistaDB
276. LokiJS
277. AlaSQL
278. Actian PSQL
279. Databend
280. SearchBlox
281. Rasdaman
282. Mimer SQL
283. Starcounter
284. FalkorDB
285. Fluree
286. Sequoiadb
287. Postgres-XL
288. InfiniteGraph
289. Strabon
290. Mulgara
291. ArcadeDB
292. FeatureBase
293. Brytlyt
294. OpenQM
295. Project Voldemort
296. Fujitsu Enterprise Postgres
297. Kyoto Tycoon
298. RedStore
299. Vald
300. Manticore Search
301. Tokyo Tyrant
302. PieCloudDB
303. ModeShape
304. XTDB
305. Actian FastObjects
306. LeanXcale
307. YTsaurus
308. RDFox
309. Immudb
310. PipelineDB
311. NEventStore
312. 4store
313. Axibase
314. YottaDB
315. AnzoGraph DB
316. TransLattice
317. Warp 10
318. MyScale
319. Raima Database Manager
320. Faircom DB
321. BigObject
322. XtremeData
323. OrigoDB
324. Tibco ComputeDB
325. EsgynDB
326. ElevateDB
327. GreptimeDB
328. Apache HugeGraph
329. Tajo
330. IBM Db2 Event Store
331. Valentina Server
332. Redland
333. Ultipa
334. Quasardb
335. chDB
336. HyperGraphDB
337. Riak TS
338. Linter
339. Sparksee
340. Lovefield
341. FlockDB
342. AgensGraph
343. Speedb
344. Bangdb
345. TerminusDB
346. Badger
347. Exorbyte
348. SiteWhere
349. ScaleOut StateServer
350. Alibaba Cloud Table Store
351. GraphBase
352. CubicWeb
353. EJDB
354. Blueflood
355. Elliptics
356. Kuzu
357. SenseiDB
358. VictoriaLogs
359. Indica
360. Forge (IRONdb)
361. Machbase Neo
362. NosDB
363. STSdb
364. WakandaDB
365. Sadas Engine
366. Jade
367. JethroData
368. Heroic
369. Hawkular Metrics
370. OpenMLDB
371. Dydra
372. SmallSQL
373. SparkleDB
374. Faircom EDGE
375. gStore
376. TinkerGraph
377. Acebase
378. Resin Cache
379. SWC-DB
380. Eloquera
381. OushuDB
382. Siaqodb
383. LedisDB
384. SwayDB
385. ActorDB
386. AntDB
387. BergDB
388. BrightstarDB
389. Cachelot.io
390. CortexDB
391. CovenantSQL
392. DaggerDB
393. DataFS
394. Diana DB
395. Easysearch
396. Edge Intelligence
397. EdgelessDB
398. Galaxybase
399. H2GIS
400. Helium
401. HGraphDB
402. HyperLevelDB
403. iBoxDB
404. InfinityDB
405. JaguarDB
406. JasDB
407. K-DB
408. Newts
409. NSDb
410. openGemini
411. OpenTenBase
412. RayforceDB
413. ReductStore
414. Rizhiyi
415. searchxml
416. SiriDB
417. Skytable
418. SpaceTime
419. SpacetimeDB
420. SvectorDB
421. TerarkDB
422. TidesDB
423. Tigris
424. Tkrzw
425. TomP2P
426. Transbase
427. Transwarp ArgoDB
428. Transwarp Hippo
429. Transwarp KunDB
430. Transwarp StellarDB
431. Upscaledb
432. VelocityDB
433. VillageSQL
434. WhiteDB

== See also ==
- Comparison of relational database management systems
- List of relational database management systems
- List of NoSQL software and tools
