= VPR (disambiguation) =

VPR usually refers to Vermont Public Radio, a radio network in the US state of Vermont.

VPR or Vpr may also refer to:

- Video plankton recorder, an underwater device for recording plankton
- Visual place recognition, an application of computer vision
- Vpr, a human immunodeficiency virus gene and protein product
- Vanguarda Popular Revolucionária, a Brazilian guerilla organization later merged into the Vanguarda Armada Revolucionária Palmares
- Versatile Place and Route, a component of Verilog-to-Routing in computer-aided design
- Vanderpump Rules, an American reality television series
