= VTR (disambiguation) =

VTR often refers to a video tape recorder.

VTR may also refer to:

- VTR (telecom company)
- VTR Bio-Tech, a Chinese biotechnology company
- Vermont Railway, a reporting mark
- Verilog-to-Routing, an open-source CAD-tool for FPGAs
- Versatile Test Reactor, a sodium cooled fast reactor
- View-through rate, in online advertising
