= Inbenta =

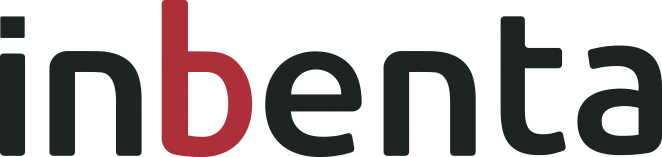
- Type: AI chatbots
- Industry: Natural language processing, artificial intelligence, Internet, information technology
- Founded: 2005
- Headquarters: Allen, Texas, United States
- Products: Natural language processing, chatbots, search engine, enterprise search, knowledge management, software
- Website: inbenta.com

Inbenta is an AI company that originated in Barcelona, Spain, in 2005. Inbenta is currently headquartered in Allen, Texas, with additional offices in Spain, São Paulo, Brazil, Toulouse, France, and Tokyo, Japan.

Inbenta provides natural language processing and semantic search through artificial intelligence.

== History ==
Inbenta raised $12 million in their Series B funding round to extend the reach of their artificial intelligence for business solutions.

In 2023, Inbenta's new chief executive officer Melissa Solis moved Inbenta's headquarters to One Bethany West in Allen, Texas from Foster City, California.

== Controversy ==
On 23 June 2018, Ticketmaster UK identified malicious software on a customer support product hosted by Inbenta Technologies, compromising personal data and payment details for thousands of Ticketmaster customers.

Three days later, Inbenta's CEO issued a message about the incident to convey the full scope of the breach. Also on its FAQ section, Inbenta claimed that "After a careful analysis of all clues and snapshots from our systems, the technical team at Inbenta discovered that the script had been implemented on the payment page. We were unaware of this, and would have advised against doing so had we known, as it presents a point of vulnerability".

On November 13, 2020, the Information Commissioner's Office fined Ticketmaster UK Limited £1.25 million for failing to protect customers' payment details. According to the ICO, "It was because of Ticketmaster's business decision to include the [Inbenta] chat bot on its payment page that the chat bot was able to unlawfully process the personal data of customers."
