= LlamaIndex =

American artificial intelligence company

- Type: Private
- Industry: Artificial intelligence Enterprise software
- Founded: April 1, 2023; 3 years ago
- Founders: Jerry Liu; Simon Suo
- Headquarters: San Francisco, California, U.S.
- Website: www.llamaindex.ai

LlamaIndex is an American artificial intelligence company headquartered in San Francisco, California. LlamaIndex specializes in agentic optical character recognition (OCR) and document intelligence infrastructure, developing tools and frameworks that are designed to help large language models (LLMs) to ingest, index, and query structured and unstructured data sources.

== History ==
LlamaIndex traces its origins to a side project by Jerry Liu that begun in late 2022, who was a machine learning engineering manager at AI safety startup Robust Intelligence at the time and formerly a research scientist at Uber's autonomous vehicle division.

Liu built a small indexing utility and published it to GitHub in November 2022, under the name GPT Tree Index. Within a few months, it had accumulated over 16,000 GitHub stars, 200,000 monthly downloads, and a Discord server of roughly 6,000 developers which convinced Liu to turn it into a company. Simon Suo, a former Uber colleague who later worked at autonomous-driving startup Waabi, joined LlamaIndex as co-founder.

The company was formally incorporated in April 2023 and the project was rebranded LlamaIndex. In June 2023, the company announced an $8.5 million seed round led by Greylock Partners, with participation from Jack Altman, Lenny Rachitsky, and Charles Xie. The following year, a survey published by InfoWorld described LlamaIndex as an orchestration provider that helps connect large language models (LLMs) to private data sources. The survey noted that LlamaIndex was primarily focused on data ingestion, indexing, and retrieval.

In March 2025, LlamaIndex, together with Cisco, LangChain, Glean, and Galileo, participated in the launch of AGNTCY, an open-source initiative intended to support interoperability and collaboration among AI agents. In the same month, LlamaIndex announced a $19 million Series A funding round, bringing its total disclosed funding to approximately $27.5 million. Investors have included Databricks and KPMG, which made a minority equity investment as part of a commercial partnership. LlamaIndex simultaneously launched LlamaCloud, a managed cloud service based on the LlamaIndex framework. LlamaIndex published LlamaParse, an agentic OCR uses a multi-agent pipeline combining computer vision, specialized VLMs, and LLM-based reasoning to handle document layouts, tables, charts, and handwriting that may be difficult for conventional OCR systems to handle.

In October 2025, IBM released an open-source Python connector enabling IBM Db2 to serve as a vector store within LlamaIndex workflows.

In March 2026, LlamaIndex released LiteParse, an open-source, TypeScript-native parsing library designed for local, offline execution. LiteParse runs entirely on the user's machine with no external API dependencies or Python requirements. Later, LiteParse was re-launched as a Rust project with native TypeScript and Python bindings, in addition to adding markdown output. In April 2026, LlamaIndex introduced ParseBench, a benchmark for evaluating document-parsing systems on enterprise documents.

== Open-source framework ==
The original open-source LlamaIndex framework was developed as a Python library, in addition to its OCR products, for building retrieval-augmented generation (RAG) applications and AI agents. The framework provides data connectors, index structures, query engines, and agent orchestration primitives. LlamaIndex introduced the Workflows abstraction, an event-driven system for creating multi-step agent pipelines with durable state, enabling long-running document processing tasks to persist across sessions. The open-source libraries are commercially licensed without restriction.

== Publications ==
LlamaIndex has been a subject of several scientific research papers, including:

- Zirnstein, Bruno (2023). "Extended context for InstructGPT with LlamaIndex". doi:10.13140/RG.2.2.17701.31204.
- Braunschweiler, Norbert; Doddipatla, Rama; Keizer, Simon; Stoyanchev, Svetlana (2023). "Evaluating Large Language Models for Document-grounded Response Generation in Information-Seeking Dialogues". arXiv:2309.11838 [cs.CL].
- Chandrasekhar, Achuth; Chan, Jonathan; Ogoke, Francis; Ajenifujah, Olabode; Barati Farimani, Amir (2024). "AMGPT: A large language model for contextual querying in additive manufacturing". Additive Manufacturing Letters. 11 100232. doi:10.1016/j.addlet.2024.100232.
- Korean Institute of Smart Media; Jo, Minjeong; Lee, Junghoon (2025-04-30). "Patient record-combined emergency rescue guide built upon LlamaIndex". Korean Institute of Smart Media. 14 (4): 87–97. doi:10.30693/SMJ.2025.14.4.87.
- Vithanage, Dinithi; Yu, Ping; Xie, Qianqian; Xu, Hua; Wang, Lei; Deng, Chao (2025). "A comprehensive evaluation of large language models for information extraction from unstructured electronic health records in residential aged care". Computers in Biology and Medicine. 197 (Pt A) 111013. doi:10.1016/j.compbiomed.2025.111013. PMID 40886641.
