= TeachEngineering =

Online digital library for K-12 engineering curriculum

TeachEngineering logo

TeachEngineering.org is a digital library of more than 1,500 K-12 engineering curricular items such as lessons, hands-on activities and maker challenges. The items feature problem-solving, project-based learning, design and systems thinking, and developing engineering habits of mind.

TeachEngineering's curricular items are aligned to K-12 science, technology, engineering and math (STEM) academic standards such as the Next Generation Science Standards, Common Core Math standards and the International Technology and Engineering Educators Association standards. Curricular items have learning objectives, engineering connections, background information, key terms and definitions, learning assessment suggestions, troubleshooting tips, estimated time/cost, and printable worksheets and handouts. Most curriculum uses common, inexpensive supplies found at grocery and hardware stores.

Most of the items in the TeachEngineering collection were developed at engineering colleges across the U.S., and all were tested in K-12 classrooms and vetted through a peer and quality review process.

== History ==
The National Science Foundation (NSF) initially funded the creation of the TeachEngineering library through its National Science Digital Library (NSDL) program. University engineering faculty, graduate students and K-12 teachers from the University of Colorado Boulder, Colorado School of Mines, Duke University and Tufts University who had independently developed K-12 engineering curriculum, bundled their curricular products into a single, standardized and searchable digital library. By 2017, more than 50 institutions had contributed curriculum. Faculty and students at Oregon State University designed and developed the supporting information system. In 2015, the system was re-designed and rebuilt at the University of Colorado Boulder. About 3 million unique users visit the library annually.

== Use Patterns ==
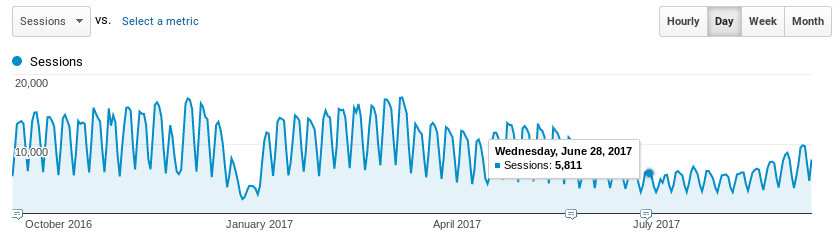
TeachEngineering usage closely tracks the US K-12 school seasons. As one can see from the figure above, daily demand follows a strict weekly cycle with usage consistently lowest on Saturdays. Usage starts to increase on Sundays when teachers prepare for classes for the coming week and further increases through Wednesdays. On Thursdays and Fridays demand decreases back toward the Saturday low. On a larger cycle, usage typically increases from the start of the school year (in August) to a peak in late March (around spring break), after which it starts trending down toward the summer vacation. Holidays such as the Fourth of July, and Thanksgiving also clearly stand out in this one-year long trajectory of daily use.

== Motivation ==
The initial motivation to create the library was the desire to preserve and widely share the outcomes from NSF's investment in K-12 engineering curriculum development through the creation of a single standardized, searchable and standards-aligned platform. Ongoing motivations include:

- To create and maintain a collection of freely available, standards-based engineering curriculum, for the purpose of improving STEM literacy.
- To provide curriculum that uses engineering as the vehicle for early development of engineering habits of mind for all youth.
- To attract more, and more diverse students to the field of engineering.
- To support educators in meeting academic learning standards by aligning curricular materials with K-12 national, international and/or state standards.
- To provide K-12 science and math teachers with science-rich hands-on engineering curriculum at little to no cost.

== Technology ==
During 2003–15, TeachEngineering ran on a LAMP stack hosted at Oregon State University's Open Source Lab (OSL). In 2015, the system was reimplemented on a Windows/IIS/RavenDB/C# stack and is currently hosted on Microsoft Azure and maintained by the University of Colorado, Boulder.
