= CloudTran =

- Developer(s): CloudTran, Inc.
- Initial release: 2010
- Stable release: 1.4.0 / May 1, 2011
- Written in: Java
- Available in: English
- Type: Transaction Manager
- License: Commercial
- Website: cloudtran.com

In computing, CloudTran, a transaction management product, enables applications running in distributed computing and cloud computing architectures to embed logical business transactions that adhere to the properties of ACID transactions. Specifically, CloudTran coordinates ACID transactionality for data stored within in-memory data grids (e.g., Oracle Coherence, GigaSpaces, and Gemfire), as well as from the data grid to persistent storage systems (e.g., Oracle, MySQL, Microsoft SQL Server, MongoDB).

Distributed computing has traditionally relied on a technology called distributed transactions which is an algorithm used to coordinate the storing of a logically related set of data within more than one database or computer. CloudTran is aimed at addressing issues with this approach to improve on performance, scalability, and ease of implementation for application developers. In doing so, CloudTran enables a broad range of developers to implement highly scalable applications that run in cloud computing environments and distributed architectures. In addition, CloudTran is a manifestation of “Cloud Transaction Processing, or, “CloudTP”.

== See also ==
- Distributed computing
- Distributed transaction processing
- Extreme Transaction Processing
- Grid computing
- Transaction processing
