= Semantic algorithm =

Computational engineering concept

Semantic algorithm is a computational engineering concept in computer science for information retrieval, and natural language processing. It uses the meaning of words, texts, or concepts, rather than exact word matching, to compare, find, classify, or infer information. Primarily, it is used in writing for several families of methods that estimate semantic similarity, semantic relatedness, or query intent.

== Methods ==
There is no single implementation of a semantic algorithm. Depending on the application, semantic information may be represented and processed using different methods.

- Lexical methods use relationships between words, such as synonymy and hierarchical relationships, often obtained from lexical databases such as WordNet.
- Ontology-based methods uses the concepts and relationships within a particular domain and implement those representations for matching or inference.
- Structural methods use the organization and relationships between elements, such as the structure of database or XML schema.
- Hybrid methods combine several matching criteria or algorithms. It may combine lexical, structural, ontology-based, and user-feedback information.
- Semantic metadata and repositories associate algorithms with descriptions and domain information.

== Relation to other concepts ==
A semantic algorithm should not be confused with semantic search, which is an application area concerned with retrieving information according to meaning or user intent. Semantic algorithms can be used to implement semantic-search systems, but the term itself is broader and has also been applied to schema matching, network synthesis, and software workflow generation. The term is also distinct from semantics (computer science), which concerns with computational constructs. Similarly, semantic security is a specific concept in cryptography and is unrelated to the general use of the term semantic algorithm.

== See also ==
- Semantic search
- Semantic similarity
- Distributional semantics
- Latent semantic analysis
- Explicit semantic analysis
- Semantic network
- Word-sense disambiguation
- Lesk algorithm
- Knowledge graph
