= TypeDB =

Open-source, strongly-typed database

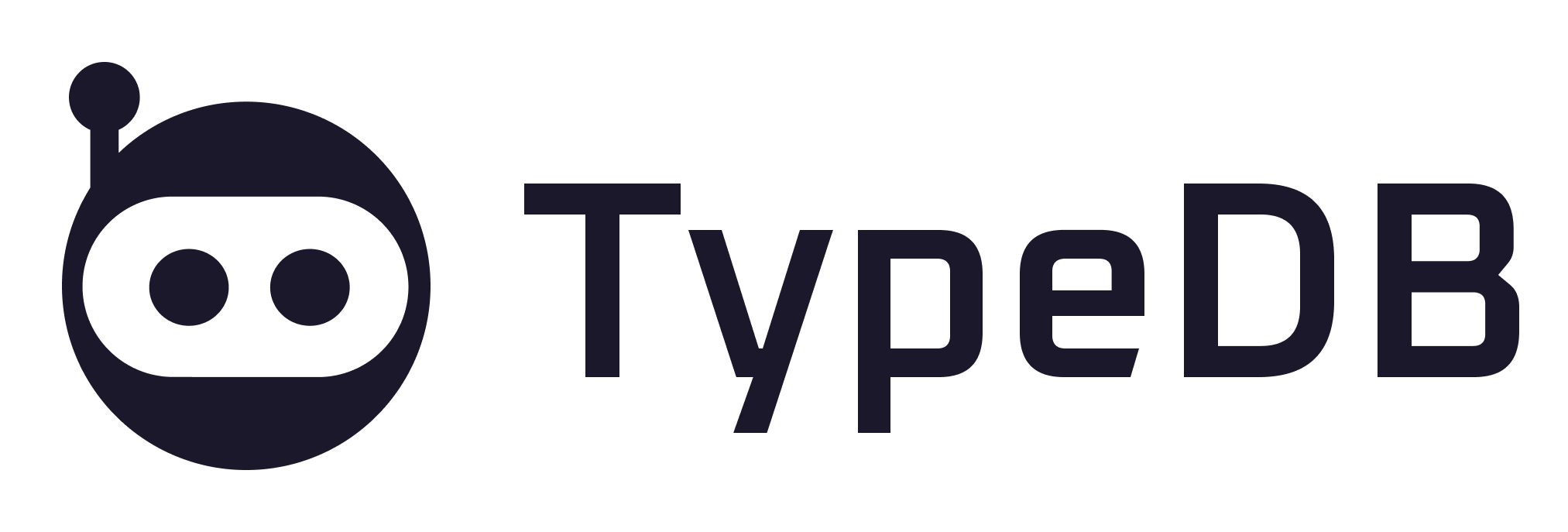
- Original author: Haikal Pribadi
- Developer: TypeDB
- Release: 9 September 2016; 10 years ago
- Stable release: 3.13.0 / 8 September 2026
- Written in: Rust
- Operating system: Cross-platform
- Type: Graph database
- License: MPL-2.0
- Website: www.typedb.com
- Repository: github.com/typedb/typedb

TypeDB is an open-source, distributed database management system that relies on a user-defined type system to model, manage, and query data.

== Overview ==
The data model of TypeDB is based on primitives from conceptual data modeling, which are implemented in a type system (see § Data and query model) and is intuitively understood as a hypergraph structure. The type system can be extended with user-defined types, type dependencies, and subtyping, which together act as a database schema. The model has been mathematically defined under the name polymorphic entity-relation-attribute model.

To specify schemas and to create, modify, and extract data from the TypeDB database, programmers use the query language TypeQL. The language is noteworthy for its intended resemblance to natural language, following a subject–verb–object statement structure for a fixed set of "key verbs" (see § Examples).

== History ==
TypeDB has roots in the knowledge representation system Grakn (a portmanteau of the words "graph" and "knowledge"), which was initially developed at the University of Cambridge Computer Science Department. Grakn was commercialized in 2017 led by then CEO Haikal Pribadi, and development was taken over by Grakn Labs Ltd. Later that year, Grakn was awarded the "Product of the Year" award by the University of Cambridge Computer Science Department.

In 2021, the first version of TypeDB was built from Grakn with the intention of creating a general-purpose database. The query language of Grakn, Graql, was incorporated into TypeDB's query language, TypeQL, at the same time.

TypeDB Cloud, the database-as-a-service edition of TypeDB, was first launched at the end of 2023.

In December 2024, TypeDB 3.0 was released, with a full rewrite of the original Java-based database to Rust and significant enhancements in TypeQL.

As of mid 2025, long time CEO Haikal Pribadi stepped down and left the business. He was succeeded by Callum Hemsley who transitioned from COO to interim CEO. Joshua Send, who was an engineering leader at the company and the architect of TypeDB 3.0 stepped up as the company's first dedicated CTO.

=== Grakn version history ===
The initial version of Grakn, version 0.1.1, was released on September 15, 2016.

Grakn 1.0.0 was released on December 14, 2017.

Grakn 2.0.0 was released on April 1, 2021.

=== TypeDB version history ===
TypeDB 2.1.0, the first public version of TypeDB, was released on May 20, 2021.

TypeDB 3.0.0, the first version of TypeDB 3, was released on December 20, 2024.

== Features ==
TypeDB is offered in three editions: an open-source edition, called TypeDB Community Edition, a proprietary edition, called TypeDB Cloud, which provides additional cloud-based management features, and an enterprise edition, called TypeDB Enterprise

TypeDB features a NoSQL data and querying model, which aims to introduce ideas from type systems and functional programming to database management.

=== Database architecture ===
General database features include the following.

- ACID-compliance
- Static type-checking of queries
- Graphical user interface (TypeDB Studio)
- Storage engine based on RocksDB
- Synchronous replication through RAFT for scalability
- TLS support
- Unicode support

=== Data and query model ===
TypeDB's data and query model differs from traditional relational database management systems in the following points.

- Instead of tables and columns, TypeDB employs types, subtypings between types, and type dependencies to describe the database schema. It is argued that this may facilitate schema extensions and normalization, and may help clarify data dependencies.
- Instead of formulating queries with algebraic operators as in SQL, TypeQL queries are sequences of statements that represent composite types. It is argued that this yields a “more declarative” querying style (see § Examples).
- TypeDB provides support for Datalog-like functions (based on the correspondence of logical implication to function types), which can be defined recursively. This can have advantages for graph data workloads, as most graph algorithms are formulated recursively.
- TypeDB's data model, based on subtyping and type dependencies, is aimed at modeling a variety of data structures. This subsumes relational data, structured tree-like data, structured graph-like data, data with inheritance, and hypergraph-like data.

=== Limitations ===
By relying on a non-standard data and query model, TypeDB (at present) has no support for the integration of established relational or column-oriented database standards, file formats (such as CSV, Parquet), or the query language SQL. Moreover, TypeDB has no direct facility for working with unstructured data or vector data.

== Query language ==
TypeQL, the query language of TypeDB, acts both as data definition and data manipulation language.

The query language builds on well-known ideas from conceptual modeling, referring to independent types holding objects as entity types, dependent types holding objects as relation types, and types holding values as attribute types. The language is composed of query clauses comprising statements. Statements, especially for data manipulation, usually follow a subject–verb–object structure.

The formal specification of the query language was presented at ACM PODS 2024, where it received the "Best Newcomer" Award.

=== Examples ===
The following (incomplete) query creates a type schema using a define query clause.

define
  entity person, 
    owns name @card(1),
    plays booking:passenger;
  relation booking, 
    relates passenger,
    relates flight,
    owns booking_date;
  attribute name,
    value string;
  ...

The following query retrieves objects and values from the database that match the pattern given in the match clause.

match
  $j isa person, has name $n;
  $n contains "Jane";
  $b isa booking, 
    links (passenger: $j, flight: $f);
    has booking_date >= 2024-01-01;
  $f has flight_time < 120;
  $f links (destination: $c);
  $c has name "Santiago de Chile";

== Licensing ==
The open-source edition of TypeDB is published under the Mozilla Public License.

== Bibliography ==
- Dorn, Christoph; Pribadi, Haikal (2024), "TypeQL: A Type-Theoretic & Polymorphic Query Language", Proceedings of the ACM on Management of Data, 2 (2), New York, NY, USA: Association for Computing Machinery: 1–27, doi:10.1145/3651611
- Sijs, Joris; Fletcher, James (2022), "On a hypergraph structuring semantic information for robots navigating and conducting their task in real-world, indoor environments", 2022 26th International Conference on Methods and Models in Automation and Robotics (MMAR), IEEE, pp. 430–435, doi:10.1109/MMAR55195.2022.9874265, ISBN 978-1-6654-6858-9
