= CloudKit =

Apple-based backend framework

- Developer(s): Apple
- Target platform(s): macOS, iOS, iPadOS, watchOS, tvOS, Web
- Format(s): API, Framework
- Status: Active
- Website: CloudKit at Apple Developer

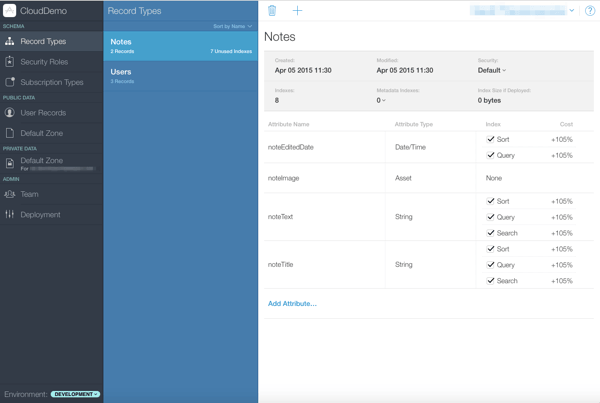
CloudKit Dashboard

CloudKit is an integrated macOS, iOS, iPadOS, watchOS, and tvOS API that functions as a backend as a service (BaaS). CloudKit is the framework that powers iCloud on those operating systems and on the web.

== Services ==
Application developers can utilize CloudKit for integrated access to Apple's iCloud servers into iOS and macOS applications. The framework provides authentication, a private database, a public database and structured asset storage services allowing developers to focus on client-side development. It is the foundation for both iCloud Storage and iCloud Photo Library.

CloudKit also offers several APIs to access the iCloud Storage, where a user can store data and files so that they can be easily accessible from other devices.

== Reception ==
Developers claim that this framework "replaces back-end web services like old-school databases, file storage and user authentication systems."

== See also ==
- Parse (company)
