= OpenEdge =

American technology company

Global Payments Integrated
- Company type: Subsidiary
- Industry: Payment processing
- Founded: 2014; 12 years ago, as a merger of Accelerated Payment Technologies and PayPros, acquired by Global Payments
- Headquarters: Lindon, Utah, U.S.
- Key people: Robert Cortopassi (President); Jim Hightower (Senior Vice President, Operations); Robyn Thompson (Vice President, Human Resources); Matt Hyde (Vice President, Sales)
- Revenue: ▲US$ 600 million (2018)
- Owner: Global Payments
- Number of employees: 5,001-10,000 (2019)
- Website: GlobalPaymentsIntegrated.com

Global Payments Integrated (formerly OpenEdge Payments, LLC) is an American company providing financial technology services via payment processing integration. Headquartered in Lindon, Utah, Global Payments Integrated is a subsidiary of Global Payments whose stock is a component of the S&P 500 stock market index.

== Business ==
Global Payments Integrated provides payment processing services to merchants, allowing them to accept credit and debit cards, along with other payment types (this role is known as a merchant acquirer). In return, they receive a percentage of the transaction value (usually about 1-2% for credit cards). They provide these services both directly to merchants, and indirectly through other financial organizations. Global Payments Integrated also develops new software for clients to better integrate with existing systems.

Global Payments Integrated's parent organization is a Fortune 1000 company.

== History ==
In October 2012, Global Payments acquired the smaller Accelerated Payment Technologies for $413 million.

In January 2015, it bought Payment Processing (also known as PayPros), a California company, for $420 million. Accelerated Payment Technologies and PayPros operated under the new name of OpenEdge.

In 2018, Global Payments completed acquisition of AdvancedMD - a partner of OpenEdge Payments.

On May 28, 2019, Global Payments announced a $21.5 billion merger with TSYS. The merger is expected to trigger a Federal Trade Commission investigation. OpenEdge Payments's role in the merger is unclear at this time.
