= VTR Bio-Tech =

Chinese biotechnology company

- Native name: 广东溢多利生物科技股份有限公司
- Romanized name: Guǎngdōng Yìduōlì Shēngwù Kējì Gǔfèn Yǒuxiàn Gōngsī
- Type: Public
- Traded as: SZSE: 300381
- Industry: Biotechnology
- Founded: August 1991; 35 years ago, Zhuhai, Guangdong, China
- Founder: Chen Shaomei
- Headquarters: Zhuhai, Guangdong, China
- Area served: Worldwide
- Key people: Chen Shaomei (Chairman)
- Products: Enzyme preparations, biosynthetic products, plant extracts
- Website: www.vtrbiotech.com

Guangdong VTR Bio-Tech Co., Ltd. (广东溢多利生物科技股份有限公司; Guǎngdōng Yìduōlì Shēngwù Kējì Gǔfèn Yǒuxiàn Gōngsī), trading as VTR Biotech, is a Chinese biotechnology company headquartered in Zhuhai, Guangdong. The company develops, manufactures, and sells industrial and feed enzymes, biosynthetic products and plant extracts. It is a public company listed on the ChiNext board of the Shenzhen Stock Exchange.

VTR Bio-Tech was founded in August 1991 by Chen Shaomei, initially producing enzyme additives for the Chinese animal feed industry. Its products are used in animal nutrition and health, human nutrition and health, care and cleaning, bioenergy, food and beverages, pulp and paper, textiles and leather, and environmental protection and ecological agriculture.

== History ==
Chen Shaomei, a former schoolteacher and employee of a Zhuhai state trading company, rented a small workshop in the Gongbei district of Zhuhai, Guangdong province in August 1991 and named the venture Yiduoli (溢多利), a Chinese approximation of the English word "victory". At the time, domestic research into enzyme preparations was in its infancy, and the company concentrated on feed enzymes for livestock producers.

VTR Bio-Tech's shares began trading on the ChiNext board of the Shenzhen Stock Exchange on 28 January 2014.

In July 2018, VTR Bio-Tech announced a joint venture with the German feed-additive company Phytobiotics Futterzusatzstoffe to make and sell enzymes in Europe. The venture was based in Neuendettelsau, Bavaria, Germany.

In December 2021, VTR Bio-Tech agreed to pay US$2.83 million to the California company Fornia BioSolutions to develop two enzyme preparations, one intended to reduce the use of decolourisers in papermaking and the other to lower the cost of producing starch sugar for animal feed.

== Products ==
VTR Bio-Tech specialises in enzyme preparation, biosynthetic products, and plant extracts. Its enzyme range covers feed enzymes such as phytase, xylanase, lipase and β-mannanase; energy enzymes including glucoamylase and thermostable α-amylase; detergent, food, papermaking and textile enzymes. Plant extracts include veterinary and human product lines; its subsidiary Hunan Micolta Bioresources produces Macleaya extract and sanguinarine-based preparations used as alternatives to in-feed antibiotics, following the Chinese ban on growth-promoting drug additives in feed that took effect in 2020.

The company has also worked in synthetic biology, including calcium propionate production strains and organic acids, and an R-PET enzyme intended for the biological degradation of waste plastics and textiles for recycling.

== Research and development ==
In 2018 the company's research institute was approved as a National Enterprise Technology Center by a panel comprising the National Development and Reform Commission, the Ministry of Science and Technology, the Ministry of Finance, the General Administration of Customs and the State Taxation Administration.

VTR Bio-Tech is one of the principal drafting organisations for national standards on feed-additive phytase and xylanase.

== International operations ==
VTR Bio-Tech established an Australian subsidiary, VTR Biotech PTY Limited, and a representative office in Russia, alongside its German operations. In November 2025, its European subsidiary began trading under the brand Vnzymes and opened an office in Frankfurt. In March 2026, the company opened an office in São Paulo, Brazil.

VTR Bio-Tech regularly exhibits at international trade fairs, such as the International Production & Processing Expo in Atlanta, United States and VIV Asia in Bangkok, Thailand.

== See also ==
- Industrial enzymes
- Novozymes
- Feed additive
