= RavenDB =

NoSQL document-oriented database

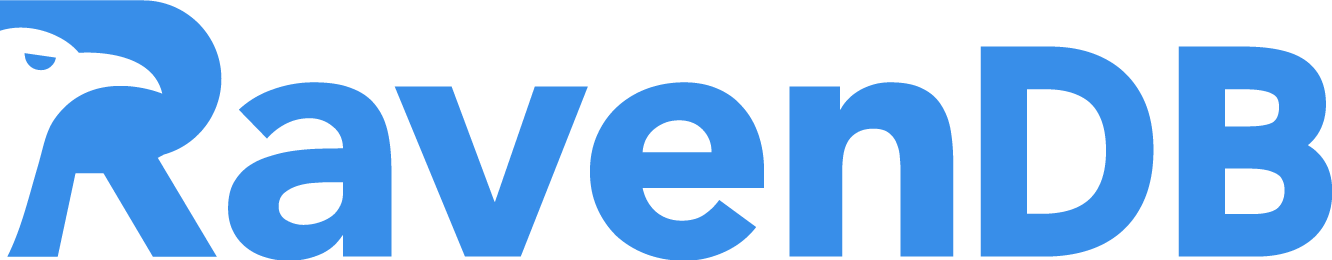
- Original author: Oren Eini (aka Ayende Rahien)
- Developer: RavenDB
- Initial release: 2010; 16 years ago
- Stable release: 7.2 LTS / February 2026; 0 months ago
- Written in: C#
- Engine: Voron
- Operating system: Windows, Linux, Mac OS, AWS, Azure, GCP
- Available in: English
- Type: Document-oriented database
- License: AGPLv3
- Website: ravendb.net
- Repository: github.com/ravendb/ravendb

RavenDB is an open-source document-oriented database written in C#, developed by RavenDB Ltd. It's built on top of the custom Voron storage engine and supports ACID transactions. RavenDB uses a SQL-like query language, (RQL), and includes native features for handling time series, graph querying, and full-text search. It is cross-platform, supported on Windows, Linux, Mac OS, AWS, Azure, and GCP and can be deployed on cloud, on-prem, and the edge, including constrained environments such as Raspberry Pi Zero. RavenDB can be deployed in distributed clusters with master-master replication.

== History ==
Originally named "Rhino DivanDB", RavenDB began in 2008 as a project by Oren Eini (aka Ayende Rahien) and was developed by the company’s former name, Hibernating Rhinos Ltd. RavenDB is described as one of the first document databases to run natively on the .NET Framework, and to offer multi-document ACID transactions

In 2019, the company began offering RavenDB as a cloud service named RavenDB Cloud.

In 2020, version 5.0 added document compression and time series support. Subsequent releases included version 5.2 (LTS) in 2021 with improvements for business intelligence and ETL workflows, version 6.0 in 2023 with a new indexing engine, sharding support, and messaging‑queue integrations, and version 6.2 (LTS) in 2024 with further stability and operational enhancements.

In February 2025, version 7 was released with vector search and AI integration.

In July 2025, version 7.1 introduced AI Agent Creator and GenAI Integration.

In August 2025, the company officially changed its name from “Hibernating Rhinos Ltd.” to “RavenDB Ltd.”

In February 2026, version 7.2 was announced as an LTS release.

== Background ==
RavenDB was created primarily for the .NET ecosystem and was one of the early document databases to provide full ACID transactions. Over time, it has expanded from a .NET-centric document database into a cross-platform product with client APIs for multiple runtimes and deployment options on-premises and in the cloud. Its feature set has advanced and now includes cluster-wide transactions, full-text search based on Lucene and Corax (full text search engines), time series support, ETL and analytics integrations. Additionally, starting with version 7.x, the following AI related features are available: vector search capabilities intended for AI and semantic search workloads, generative AI and AI Agents features. As of 2025, RavenDB serves over 12,000 customers and over 1,000 organizations.

== Version history ==
| Version | Date | Features added (partial list) |
|---|---|---|
| 7.2 | February 2026 | Native AI Assistant, Remote Attachments, and JSON Schema Validation |
| 7.1 | June 2025 | Generative AI integration; AI Agents; Embedding Generation |
| 7.0 | February 2025 | Vector Search; ETL for Amazon SQS and Snowflake |
| 6.2 | Sept 2024 | ETL to Azure Queue Storage; Open Telemetry support |
| 6.0 | August 2023 | Corax; Sharding; Data Archival; Sinks for Kafka and RabbitMQ |
| 5.4 | June 2022 | Corax experimental release; ETL for Kafka and RabbitMQ |
| 5.3 | November 2021 | Concurrent Data Subscriptions; Microsoft Power BI support |
| 5.2 | June 2021 | OLAP ETL; Custom Analyzers |
| 5.1 | November 2020 | Indexing attachments; Hub/Sink replication with filtering |
| 5.0 | July 2020 | Time series; Data compression using the Zstd algorithm |
| 4.2 | May 2019 | Graph querying |
| 4.1 | August 2018 | Cluster-wide transactions |
| 4.0 | February 2018 | Became cross-platform; free license |
| 3.5 | October 2016 | Clustering |
| 3.0 | November 2014 | Java API; Voron storage engine |
| 2.5 | June 2013 | Projections; facet querying |
| 2.0 | January 2013 | Replication |
| 1.0 | May 2010 | |

- Green: Supported
- Red: Not supported

=== System architecture ===
Data is stored as schemaless documents blittable format that allows fast transformations from and to JSON. Documents are grouped into collections, with each document having exactly one collection.

Databases can be deployed on a distributed cluster of servers (called ‘nodes’) using multi-master replication. RavenDB uses a custom implementation of Raft called Rachis for consensus and clustering. Replication is performed in a cluster-agnostic manner. Tasks are distributed to the different nodes in a balanced way.

Versions 1.0 through 3.5 supported sharding, but versions 4.x do not, and reintroduced sharding starting with version 6.0.

RavenDB originally used the ESENT storage engine. Version 3.0 replaced it with a new open-source storage engine called Voron. Since 5.4, RavenDB provides a custom-built indexing engine called Corax.

Hub/Sink replication with filtering is available since 5.1, and sharding is supported starting from 6.0.

Clients are supported for C#, C++, Java, NodeJS, Python, Ruby, PHP and Go.

== Main features ==
- ACID transactions, including cluster-wide
- Clustering with Raft consensus
- An efficient custom storage engine
- Asynchronous indexing
- Automatic indexing

=== Indexes and querying ===
Queries are expressed in LINQ or with a custom query language named RQL (stands for Raven Query Language) with syntax similar to SQL.

- Auto indexes - in RavenDB queries can only be satisfied by an index; if no appropriate index exists, a new index is created to satisfy the query.
- Projection - indexes can be configured to transform indexed data, perform calculations, perform aggregations, and execute JavaScript code on the server side.
- Full-text search - at a low level, data is indexed with Lucene.net or Corax, which means indexes support full-text search.
- Vector search - documents can be searched by their semantic similarity; they are indexed using HNSW algorithm; RavenDB supports embeddings generation.

== Document extensions ==
Documents can be extended with other data types less suited to JSON. These extensions can be loaded, modified, and stored independently of the document itself.

- Attachments - documents can have multiple attachments of any data type, such as images, audio, or pure binary.
- Time Series - numerical data associated with specific times and ordered chronologically.
- Distributed counters - atomic counters that can be modified concurrently across the cluster without locking or conflicts.
- Revisions - a built-in audit capability, capturing snapshots of documents as they change; revisions can be used for data auditing, instant restoration after document corruption, and other purposes.

== Cluster-wide ACID Transactions ==
ACID transactions can be executed at the scope of a cluster (in addition to single node transactions). The transaction will only be persisted if it is confirmed by a consensus of nodes; if it is not, the transaction is cancelled and rolled back.

== Generative AI and Vector Integration ==
In version 7.1, RavenDB introduced a comprehensive AI integration layer, positioning the database as a core component for Retrieval-Augmented Generation (RAG) and other AI workflows, eliminating the need for external vector databases.

- Vector Database Capabilities: RavenDB natively stores and indexes high-dimensional embedding vectors, enabling searches based on contextual similarity rather than exact keywords.
- Generative AI Tasks: This feature allows for autonomous, intelligent data processing by defining ongoing tasks that run within the database.
- AI Agents: RavenDB AI Agents facilitate continuous, interactive conversations between a client and an LLM, leveraging the database's data. The conversation history is stored within the database, allowing for multi-turn interactions.

== RavenDB Cloud ==
RavenDB Cloud is a managed database-as-a-service launched in 2019 on AWS, Azure, and GCP. The service performs administration tasks such as hardware maintenance and security for users. It features the sharing of CPU resources among the different nodes in a cluster to prevent throttling.

== Embedded instance ==
RavenDB can also be run as an embedded instance, a great option for smaller applications and proof of concepts, for instance..

== Licensing ==
RavenDB is open source under an AGPLv3 license. It is available with a commercial license and a free license for open source projects, but it must be applied for.

== Security and reliability ==
RavenDB implements authentication and authorization using X.509 certificates. Client certificates are associated with security clearances and database-level permissions, and all communications can be encrypted using TLS/SSL or HTTPS. The database also supports auditing of operations to track access and changes.

For disaster recovery, RavenDB provides ongoing backup tasks, including full and incremental backups, which allow point-in-time recovery. Replication tasks can maintain live copies of data and synchronize it across multiple regions.

RavenDB tracks and assesses publicly reported vulnerabilities. For example, CVE‑2025‑55315 was publicly triaged and analyzed through the vendor’s official channels.
