= Microsoft Fabric =

Unified data analytics platform by Microsoft

- Developer: Microsoft
- Release: November 15, 2023; 2 years ago
- Operating system: web; Windows 10, 11 (Power BI Desktop client); Android 8+; iOS 15+ (Note: Including iPadOS)
- Type: Data analytics Data engineering Business intelligence
- License: Proprietary; SaaS
- Website: www.microsoft.com/en-us/microsoft-fabric

Microsoft Fabric is an end-to-end, software-as-a-service data analytics platform developed by Microsoft that unifies data engineering, data integration, data warehousing, data science, real-time analytics, and business intelligence under a single product. It was announced at Microsoft Build in May 2023 and reached general availability in November 2023. Fabric brings together several previously separate Microsoft data products — including Microsoft Azure Synapse Analytics, Azure Data Factory, and Power BI — into a single SaaS environment built around a shared, open-format data lake called OneLake.

== General ==
Microsoft Fabric is organized as a set of workload-specific "experiences" that all read and write data from the same underlying OneLake store, removing the need to copy or move data between separate analytics tools. Data can be ingested from databases, SaaS applications, files, streaming sources, and on-premises systems using built-in connectors, and can then be transformed, modeled, and analyzed within the same workspace used to build interactive Power BI reports. One differentiator of the platform is its "Direct Lake" mode, which allows Power BI to query data stored in OneLake directly, without a separate import or refresh step.

== History ==
Microsoft Fabric was unveiled at the Microsoft Build developer conference on 23 May 2023 as a successor and consolidation point for several of the company's existing data products. It entered public preview immediately following the announcement and moved to general availability on 15 November 2023 at Microsoft Ignite. Fabric absorbed and rebuilt the capabilities of earlier Microsoft data products, including Microsoft Azure Synapse Analytics(data warehousing and Spark-based engineering), Azure Data Factory (data integration and pipelines), and Power BI (visualization and reporting), while introducing OneLake as a single, tenant-wide data lake underpinning all of them.

In subsequent updates, Microsoft added generative-AI features to Fabric under the Copilot brand, including natural-language data preparation, code generation for notebooks, and automated report creation in Power BI. Microsoft has continued to expand Fabric's workloads, including the addition of a dedicated Data Activator service for automated, trigger-based actions on incoming data.

== Key components ==
Key components of the Microsoft Fabric ecosystem are as follows:

OneLake
A single, tenant-wide data lake built on Azure Data Lake Storage that stores data in open formats such as Parquet and Delta Lake, acting as the common storage layer for every Fabric workload.
Data Factory
The data integration and orchestration experience, used to build pipelines and dataflows that move and transform data from a wide range of source systems into OneLake.
Synapse Data Engineering
A Apache Spark-based experience for large-scale data transformation and engineering, using notebooks and Spark jobs.
Synapse Data Warehouse
A SQL-based data warehousing experience that provides transactional guarantees over data stored in OneLake in an open Delta Lake format.
Synapse Data Science
A workspace for building, training, and deploying machine learning models, integrated with tools such as MLflow.
Synapse Real-Time Intelligence
An experience for ingesting, processing, and analyzing high-volume streaming and event data, including a KQL database.
Data Activator
A no-code service that monitors data in Fabric and OneLake and automatically triggers actions or alerts when specified conditions are met.
Power BI
The reporting and visualization experience carried over from Microsoft's existing business intelligence product, extended in Fabric with Direct Lake connectivity to OneLake.
Fabric Data Agents
Copilot-based conversational agents that let business users query data in Fabric using natural language.

== Licenses ==
Microsoft Fabric is sold primarily through Fabric capacity SKUs, a pool of compute resources (measured in "Capacity Units") shared across all Fabric workloads in a tenant, rather than through per-user licenses for each individual workload. Capacities can be purchased as pay-as-you-go Azure resources that can be paused and resumed, or as reserved Power BI Premium capacity. Individual users still require a Power BI Pro or Premium Per User license to create and share certain Power BI content, consistent with existing Power BI licensing. A free trial capacity is available to new tenants for evaluation purposes.

== Industry applications ==
A common driver of Fabric adoption is consolidating BI tools and data platforms that had been managed separately, into a single governed environment built on OneLake. Flora Food Group, a global plant-based food manufacturer, migrated off separate Synapse, Data Factory, and Power BI deployments onto Fabric using a medallion (bronze-silver-gold) architecture, citing a simpler architecture and lower costs as outcomes. In regulated sectors such as financial services, firms have used a Fabric Lakehouse to replace legacy third-party BI platforms and unify data scattered across CRM, trust, and compliance systems into one governed source of reporting, in place of licensing and maintaining a separate BI product. Other reported use cases include retailers building real-time "customer 360" views by streaming sales and web data into OneLake, manufacturers applying predictive maintenance models to supply-chain data, and healthcare organizations unifying patient data for analytics, though public detail on outcomes for these use cases is more limited than for BI-consolidation migrations.
