= Yellowbrick Data =

Database company headquartered in Mountain View, California, US

- Type: Private
- Industry: Data warehousing, SQL analytics
- Founded: 2014; 12 years ago
- Headquarters: Mountain View, California, United States
- Key people: Neil Carson (CEO); Jason Snodgress (COO); Tim Young (CMO); Mark Cusack (CTO)
- Products: Yellowbrick Data Warehouse
- Website: www.yellowbrick.com

Yellowbrick Data is a US-based database company delivering massively parallel processing (MPP) data warehouse and SQL analytics products. The company is headquartered in Mountain View, California.

== History ==
Yellowbrick Data was founded in 2014 by Neil Carson, Jim Dawson, and Mark Brinicombe to bring to market Yellowbrick Data Warehouse, a flash storage data warehouse product. Yellowbrick’s first product used hardware consisting of analytic blades with both NVMe flash storage and CPUs, with the blades connected by an internal network. The system includes a purpose built execution engine with a primary column store, built in compression, as well as erasure encoding for reliability. The Yellowbrick Data Warehouse supports ANSI SQL and ACID reliability by using a Postgres based front-end, supporting any database driver or external connector. The all-flash architecture claims performance and predictability benefits compared to other data warehouses.

In 2019, Yellowbrick announced two products – the Yellowbrick Cloud Data Warehouse, and Yellowbrick Cloud DR. The Cloud Data Warehouse is a service offering, using its own hardware available to applications running in AWS, Azure, and GCP public clouds through dedicated network links. This product allows the same speed and reliability advantages as the Data Warehouse, and complements the on-premises product. Cloud DR allows replication of on-premises datasets to the cloud service, or between cloud services at multiple physical locations.

In 2022 Yellowbrick announced a fully cloud native version of Yellowbrick Data Warehouse, based on Kubernetes, available across all public clouds including AWS Marketplace, Azure, and GCP. The cloud native product retains many of the same architectural principles as the hardware product, such as Massively Parallel Processing, column storage, NVMe flash storage, compatibility with PostgreSQL front-end interfaces and the SQL query language. Following the cloud native approach enables Yellowbrick to be deployed in any public cloud and delivers on cloud benefits such as elasticity and separation of storage and compute. The storage architecture in the cloud adds the use of cloud object storage, such as AWS S3, for persistent storage. In a departure from other similar services in the public cloud, Yellowbrick Data Warehouse does not operate a managed services layer, instead the service is deployed entirely in the target cloud account without requiring data or system metadata to be shared with the cloud operator or vendor.
