= ChromaDB =

Open-source data infrastructure for AI

Chroma
- Developer: Chroma
- Release: October 22, 2022; 3 years ago
- Stable release: v1.0.15 / July 2, 2025; 14 months ago.:
- Written in: Rust, Python, TypeScript, Go
- Operating system: Linux, macOS, Windows
- Platform: x86
- Type: Database
- License: Apache License 2.0
- Website: trychroma.com
- Repository: github.com/chroma-core/chroma

ChromaDB or simply Chroma, is an open-source vector database tailored to applications with large language models.

Its headquarters are in San Francisco. In April 2023, it raised 18 million US dollars as seed funding.

ChromaDB has been used in academic studies on artificial intelligence, particularly as part of the tech stack for retrieval-augmented generation.
