= GigaSpaces =

GigaSpaces Technologies Inc.
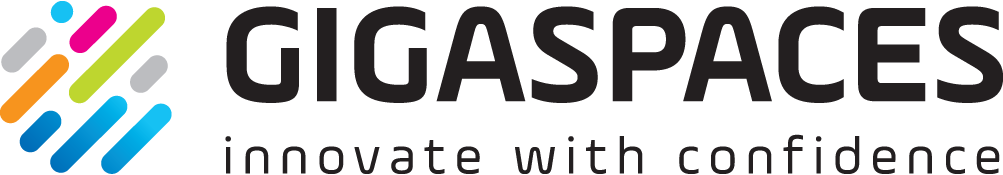
- Type: Private
- Industry: Software
- Founded: 2000
- Founders: Nati Shalom
- Headquarters: New York City, United States, US
- Key people: Adi Paz (CEO); Ira Palti (Executive Chairman)
- Products: XAP; Smart DIH; eRAG
- Website: www.gigaspaces.com

GigaSpaces Technologies Inc. is a private American software company founded in 2000 and headquartered in New York City. The company develops software for real-time and AI data solutions, including eRAG, an enterprise retrieval-augmented generation platform for natural-language querying and semantic reasoning of structured operational data.

Its other products include SmartDIH and XAP, used in in-memory computing and low-latency processing across industries such as finance, retail and transportation.

== History ==
GigaSpaces was founded in 2000 by Nati Shalom. The company initially focused on distributed computing and later expanded into in-memory technologies. In 2012, GigaSpaces introduced the open-source platform-as-a-service project Cloudify. In 2016, it launched the real-time analytics platform InsightEdge. Cloudify was spun off as an independent company in 2017.

In 2020, the company launched managed services on Google Cloud Platform and raised US$12 million in funding led by Fortissimo Capital, bringing the total investment to US$47 million.

In May 2020, GigaSpaces announced $12 million financing led by Fortissimo Capital.

In 2021, GigaSpaces introduced the Smart Digital Integration Hub (DIH) and secured an additional US$13.5 million in growth funding.

In 2022, the company announced strategic partnerships with IBM and Wix to build a digital innovation platform based on DIH.

In 2024, GigaSpaces launched eRAG, a retrieval-augmented generative AI tool that delivers the context of structured data to LLMs, at IBM Think.
