= LangChain =

Language model application development framework

Langchain logo
- Developer: Harrison Chase
- Release: October 2022
- Stable release: 1.4.6 / 14 October 2026; 39 days ago
- Written in: Python and JavaScript
- Type: Software framework for large language model application development
- License: MIT License
- Website: langchain.com
- Repository: github.com/langchain-ai/langchain

LangChain is a software framework that helps facilitate the integration of large language models (LLMs) into applications. As a language model integration framework, LangChain's use-cases largely overlap with those of language models in general, including document analysis and summarization, chatbots, and code analysis.

== History ==
LangChain was launched in October 2022 as an open source project by Harrison Chase, while working at machine learning startup Robust Intelligence. In April 2023, LangChain had incorporated and the new startup raised over $20 million in funding at a valuation of at least $200 million from venture firm Sequoia Capital, a week after announcing a $10 million seed investment from Benchmark.

In the third quarter of 2023, the LangChain Expression Language (LCEL) was introduced, which provides a declarative way to define chains of actions.

In October 2023 LangChain introduced LangServe, a deployment tool to host LCEL code as a production-ready API.

In February 2024 LangChain released LangSmith, a closed-source observability and evaluation platform for LLM applications, and announced a US $25 million Series A led by Sequoia Capital. On 14 May 2025 the company launched LangGraph Platform into general availability, providing managed infrastructure for deploying long-running, stateful AI agents.

In April 2025, LangChain was featured in the Forbes AI 50 list.

On 22 October 2025, LangChain 1.0 was released as the first major version of the framework. The release introduced a new create_agent abstraction, middleware for customizing agent behavior, and standardized content blocks for model outputs. It also reduced the scope of the main package, with legacy functionality moved to langchain-classic.

== Capabilities ==
LangChain's developers highlight the framework's applicability to use-cases including chatbots, retrieval-augmented generation, document summarization, and synthetic data generation. InfoWorld described LangChain as a software development kit that simplifies the connection between large language models and external applications through a unified API. The magazine also wrote that it can be used to bring in context from sources such as PDFs, web pages, CSV files and relational databases, while making it easier for developers to change the underlying model without major code changes.

As of March 2023, LangChain included integrations with systems including Amazon, Google, and Microsoft Azure cloud storage; API wrappers for news, movie information, and weather; Bash for summarization, syntax and semantics checking, and execution of shell scripts; multiple web scraping subsystems and templates; few-shot learning prompt generation support; finding and summarizing "todo" tasks in code; Google Drive documents, spreadsheets, and presentations summarization, extraction, and creation; Google Search and Microsoft Bing web search; OpenAI, Anthropic, and Hugging Face language models; iFixit repair guides and wikis search and summarization; MapReduce for question answering, combining documents, and question generation; N-gram overlap scoring; PyPDF, pdfminer, fitz, and pymupdf for PDF file text extraction and manipulation; Python and JavaScript code generation, analysis, and debugging; Milvus vector database to store and retrieve vector embeddings; Weaviate vector database to cache embedding and data objects; Redis cache database storage; Python RequestsWrapper and other methods for API requests; SQL and NoSQL databases including JSON support; Streamlit, including for logging; text mapping for k-nearest neighbors search; time zone conversion and calendar operations; tracing and recording stack symbols in threaded and asynchronous subprocess runs; and the WolframAlpha website and SDK. LangChain supports integration with Oracle AI Database, enabling applications to use Oracle AI Vector Search for storing and retrieving vector embeddings in retrieval-augmented generation workflows. As of April 2023, it can read from more than 50 document types and data sources.

== LangChain tools ==
Tool name	Account required?	API key required?	Licencing	Features	Documentation URL
Alpha Vantage	No	Yes	Proprietary	Financial data, analytics	https://python.langchain.com/docs/integrations/tools/alpha_vantage
Apify	No	Yes	Commercial	Web scraping, automation	https://python.langchain.com/docs/integrations/providers/apify/
ArXiv	No	No	Open Source	Scientific papers, research	https://python.langchain.com/docs/integrations/tools/arxiv
AWS Lambda	Yes	Yes	Proprietary	Serverless computing	https://python.langchain.com/docs/integrations/tools/awslambda
Bash	No	No	Open source	Shell environment access	https://python.langchain.com/docs/integrations/tools/bash
Bearly Code Interpreter	No	Yes	Commercial	Remote Python code execution	https://python.langchain.com/docs/integrations/tools/bearly
Bing Search	No	Yes	Proprietary	Search engine	https://python.langchain.com/docs/integrations/tools/bing_search
Brave Search	No	No	Open source	Privacy-focused search	https://python.langchain.com/docs/integrations/tools/brave_search
ChatGPT Plugins	No	Yes	Proprietary	ChatGPT	https://python.langchain.com/docs/integrations/tools/chatgpt_plugins
Connery	No	Yes	Commercial	API actions	https://python.langchain.com/docs/integrations/tools/connery
Dall-E Image Generator	No	Yes	Proprietary	Text-to-image generation	https://python.langchain.com/docs/integrations/tools/dalle_image_generator
DataForSEO	No	Yes	Commercial	SEO data, analytics	https://python.langchain.com/docs/integrations/tools/dataforseo
DuckDuckGo Search	No	No	Open source	Privacy-focused search	https://python.langchain.com/docs/integrations/tools/ddg
E2B Data Analysis	No	No	Open source	Data analysis	https://python.langchain.com/docs/integrations/tools/e2b_data_analysis
Eden AI	No	Yes	Commercial	AI tools, APIs	https://python.langchain.com/docs/integrations/tools/edenai_tools
Eleven Labs Text2Speech	No	Yes	Commercial	Text-to-speech	https://python.langchain.com/docs/integrations/tools/eleven_labs_tts
Exa Search	No	Yes	Commercial	Web search	https://python.langchain.com/docs/integrations/tools/exa_search
File System	No	No	Open source	File system interaction	https://python.langchain.com/docs/integrations/tools/filesystem
Golden Query	No	Yes	Commercial	Natural language queries	https://python.langchain.com/docs/integrations/tools/golden_query
Google Cloud Text-to-Speech	Yes	Yes	Proprietary	Text-to-speech	https://python.langchain.com/docs/integrations/tools/google_cloud_texttospeech
Google Drive	Yes	Yes	Proprietary	Google Drive access	https://python.langchain.com/docs/integrations/tools/google_drive
Google Finance	Yes	Yes	Proprietary	Financial data	https://python.langchain.com/docs/integrations/tools/google_finance
Google Jobs	Yes	Yes	Proprietary	Job search	https://python.langchain.com/docs/integrations/tools/google_jobs
Google Lens	Yes	Yes	Proprietary	Visual search, recognition	https://python.langchain.com/docs/integrations/tools/google_lens
Google Places	Yes	Yes	Proprietary	Location-based services	https://python.langchain.com/docs/integrations/tools/google_places
Google Scholar	Yes	Yes	Proprietary	Scholarly article search	https://python.langchain.com/docs/integrations/tools/google_scholar
Google Search	Yes	Yes	Proprietary	Search engine	https://python.langchain.com/docs/integrations/tools/google_search
Google Serper	No	Yes	Commercial	SERP scraping	https://python.langchain.com/docs/integrations/tools/google_serper
Google Trends	Yes	Yes	Proprietary	Trend data	https://python.langchain.com/docs/integrations/tools/google_trends
Gradio	No	No	Open source	Machine learning UIs	https://python.langchain.com/docs/integrations/tools/gradio_tools
GraphQL	No	No	Open source	API queries	https://python.langchain.com/docs/integrations/tools/graphql
HuggingFace Hub	No	No	Open source	Hugging Face models, datasets	https://python.langchain.com/docs/integrations/tools/huggingface_tools
Human as a tool	No	No	N/A	Human input	https://python.langchain.com/docs/integrations/tools/human_tools
IFTTT WebHooks	No	Yes	Commercial	Web service automation	https://python.langchain.com/docs/integrations/tools/ifttt
Ionic Shopping	No	Yes	Commercial	Shopping	https://python.langchain.com/docs/integrations/tools/ionic_shopping
Lemon Agent	No	Yes	Commercial	Lemon AI interaction	https://python.langchain.com/docs/integrations/tools/lemonai
Memorize	No	No	Open source	Fine-tune LLM to memorize information using unsupervised learning	https://python.langchain.com/docs/integrations/tools/memorize
Nuclia	No	Yes	Commercial	Indexing of unstructured data	https://python.langchain.com/docs/integrations/tools/nuclia
OpenWeatherMap	No	Yes	Commercial	Weather data	https://python.langchain.com/docs/integrations/tools/openweathermap
Polygon Stock Market API	No	Yes	Commercial	Stock market data	https://python.langchain.com/docs/integrations/tools/polygon
PubMed	No	No	Open source	Biomedical literature	https://python.langchain.com/docs/integrations/tools/pubmed
Python REPL	No	No	Open source	Python shell	https://python.langchain.com/docs/integrations/tools/python
Reddit Search	No	No	Open source	Reddit search	https://python.langchain.com/docs/integrations/tools/reddit_search
Requests	No	No	Open source	HTTP requests	https://python.langchain.com/docs/integrations/tools/requests
SceneXplain	No	No	Open source	Model explanations	https://python.langchain.com/docs/integrations/tools/sceneXplain
Search	No	No	Open source	Query various search services	https://python.langchain.com/docs/integrations/tools/search_tools
SearchApi	No	Yes	Commercial	Query various search services	https://python.langchain.com/docs/integrations/tools/searchapi
SearxNG	No	No	Open source	Privacy-focused search	https://python.langchain.com/docs/integrations/tools/searx_search
Semantic Scholar API	No	No	Open source	Academic paper search	https://python.langchain.com/docs/integrations/tools/semanticscholar
SerpAPI	No	Yes	Commercial	Search engine results page scraping	https://python.langchain.com/docs/integrations/tools/serpapi
StackExchange	No	No	Open source	Stack Exchange access	https://python.langchain.com/docs/integrations/tools/stackexchange
Tavily Search	No	Yes	Commercial	Question answering	https://python.langchain.com/docs/integrations/tools/tavily_search
Twilio	No	Yes	Commercial	Communication APIs	https://python.langchain.com/docs/integrations/tools/twilio
Wikidata	No	No	Open source	Structured data access	https://python.langchain.com/docs/integrations/tools/wikidata
Wikipedia	No	No	Open source	Wikipedia access	https://python.langchain.com/docs/integrations/tools/wikipedia
Wolfram Alpha	No	Yes	Proprietary	Computational knowledge	https://python.langchain.com/docs/integrations/tools/wolfram_alpha
Yahoo Finance News	No	Yes	Commercial	Financial news	https://python.langchain.com/docs/integrations/tools/yahoo_finance_news
Youtube	No	Yes	Commercial	YouTube access	https://python.langchain.com/docs/integrations/tools/youtube
Zapier Natural Language Actions	No	Yes	Commercial	Workflow automation	https://python.langchain.com/docs/integrations/tools/zapier

== See also ==
- CrewAI — framework for building and coordinating multi-agent AI systems
- Theia AI — framework for integrating AI capabilities and agents into development environments
- Lists of open-source artificial intelligence software
