= Semantic search =

Contextual queries

Semantic search denotes search with meaning, as distinguished from lexical search where the search engine looks for literal matches of the query words or variants of them, without understanding the overall meaning of the query. Semantic search is an approach to information retrieval that seeks to improve search accuracy by understanding the searcher's intent and the contextual meaning of terms as they appear in the searchable dataspace, whether on the Web or within a closed system, to generate more relevant results. Modern semantic search systems use vector embeddings which convert words, phrases, or documents into numerical vectors. This allows the engine to find results based on meaning, not just exact keyword matches.

Some authors regard semantic search as a set of techniques for retrieving knowledge from richly structured data sources like ontologies and XML as found on the Semantic Web. Such technologies enable the formal articulation of domain knowledge at a high level of expressiveness and could enable the user to specify their intent in more detail at query time. The articulation enhances content relevance and depth by including specific places, people, or concepts relevant to the query.

== Models and tools ==
Tools like Google's Knowledge Graph provide structured relationships between entities to enrich query interpretation.

Models like BERT and Sentence-BERT convert words or sentences into dense vectors for similarity comparison.

Semantic ontologies like Web Ontology Language, Resource Description Framework, and Schema.org organize concepts and relationships, allowing systems to infer related terms and deeper meanings.

Hybrid search models combine lexical retrieval (e.g., BM25) with semantic ranking using pretrained transformer models for optimal performance.

== See also ==
- Semantic algorithm
- List of search engines
- Semantic web
- Semantic unification
- Resource Description Framework
- Natural language search engine
- Semantic query
- Vector database
- Word embeddings
