= Comdb2 =

Database management system, relational, open source, developed by Bloomberg LP

- Original author: Comdb2 Team
- Developers: Comdb2 team, and other open source component developers
- Initial release: 1 January 2016; 10 years ago
- Stable release: 7.0
- Written in: C
- Operating system: Linux, Solaris, AIX
- Available in: English
- Type: RDBMS
- License: Apache v2, BSD License, MIT License, Sleepycat License
- Website: bloomberg.github.io/comdb2/

Comdb2 is an open source, highly available clustered RDBMS developed by Bloomberg LP, built on optimistic concurrency control techniques. It provides multiple isolation levels, including Snapshot and Serializable Isolation. Read/Write transactions run on any node, with the client library transparently negotiating connections to lowest cost (latency) node which is available. Comdb2 implements queues for publisher-to-subscriber message delivery. Queues can be combined with table triggers for time-consistent log distribution.

Comdb2 supports the SQLite dialect of SQL with some modifications, and embeds the Lua scripting language. Comdb2 maintains a fork of Berkeley DB to provide the key–value database backend to SQLite.

Comdb2 architecture was described in detail in this 2016 technical paper.

== See also ==
- Comparison of relational database management systems
- Multi-master replication
