= RDBM =

RDBM may refer to:

- Relational database management system (RDBMS)
- Reliable database manager, a journaled layer on top of cdb
- Reyes del Bajo Mundo, a Salvadoran hip hop group
