= Tkrzw =

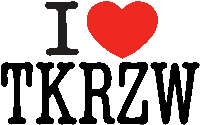
- Original author: Mikio Hirabayashi
- Developer: Google
- Release: July 11, 2020; 6 years ago
- Stable release: 1.0.33 / September 19, 2026; 2 days ago
- Written in: C++
- Type: Database engine, library
- License: Apache 2.0
- Website: dbmx.net/tkrzw/
- Repository: github.com/estraier/tkrzw

Kyoto Cabinet
- Original author: Mikio Hirabayashi
- Developer: FAL Labs
- Release: December 25, 2009; 16 years ago
- Stable release: 1.2.80 / April 14, 2023; 3 years ago
- Written in: C++
- Type: Database engine, library
- License: GPL 3
- Website: dbmx.net/kyotocabinet
- Repository: dbmx.net/kyotocabinet/pkg/

Tokyo Cabinet
- Original author: Mikio Hirabayashi
- Developer: FAL Labs
- Release: 2006; 20 years ago
- Stable release: 1.4.48 / August 10, 2012; 14 years ago
- Written in: C
- Type: Database engine, library
- License: LGPL 2.1
- Website: dbmx.net/tokyocabinet
- Repository: dbmx.net/tokyocabinet

QDBM
- Original author: Mikio Hirabayashi
- Developer: FAL Labs
- Release: 2003; 23 years ago
- Stable release: 1.8.78 / December 22, 2007; 18 years ago
- Written in: C
- Type: Database engine, library
- License: LGPL 2.1
- Website: dbmx.net/qdbm
- Repository: dbmx.net/qdbm

Tkrzw is a library of routines for managing key–value databases.

QDBM (Quick Database Manager) was the first database implementation in the series. Tokyo Cabinet was sponsored by the Japanese social networking site Mixi, and was a multithreaded embedded database manager and was announced by its authors as "a modern implementation of DBM". Kyoto Cabinet is the designated successor of Tokyo Cabinet, while Tkrzw is a recommended successor of Kyoto Cabinet.

Tokyo Cabinet features on-disk B+ trees and hash tables for key-value storage, with "some" support for transactions.

== See also ==
- Ordered key–value store
