= Margo Seltzer =

American computer scientist

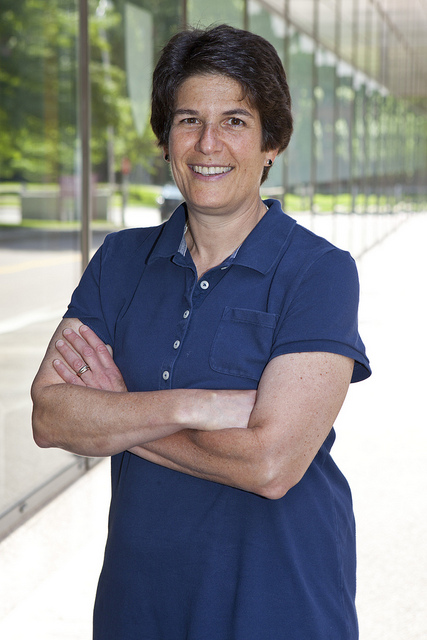
- Seltzer in 2012.
- Education: Radcliffe College (BA); University of California, Berkeley (PhD)
- Spouse: Keith Bostic
- Awards: Erna Hamburger Prize (2026)
- Scientific career
- Fields: Computer science
- Workplaces: University of British Columbia
- Thesis: File System Performance and Transaction Support (1992)
- Doctoral advisor: Michael Stonebraker
- Website: https://www.seltzer.com/margo/

Margo Ilene Seltzer is an American computer scientist. She is currently the Canada 150 Research Chair in Computer Systems and the Cheriton Family Chair in Computer Science at the University of British Columbia. Previously, Seltzer was the Herchel Smith Professor of Computer Science at Harvard University's John A. Paulson School of Engineering and Applied Sciences and director at the Center for Research on Computation and Society.

== Education ==
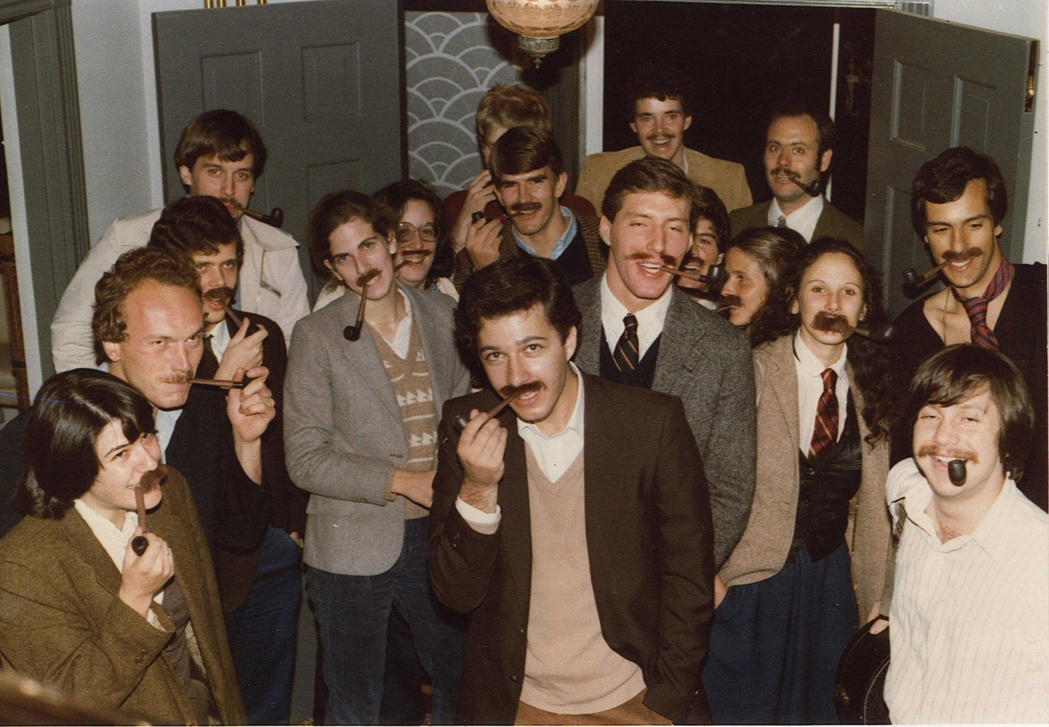
On Halloween 1982, Harvard professor Harry Lewis' teaching assistants appeared at his home in "Harry Lewis" costume, including his then-trademark mustache and pipe. Seltzer is at left.

Seltzer received her A.B. in applied mathematics from Radcliffe College in 1983, where she was teaching assistant under Harry R. Lewis at Harvard University. In 1992, she received her Ph.D. in Computer Science from the University of California, Berkeley, where her dissertation, "File System Performance and Transaction Support", was supervised by Michael Stonebraker. Her work in log-structured file systems, databases, and wide-scale caching is especially well-known, and she was lead author of the BSD-LFS paper.

== Career ==
=== Academia ===
Seltzer became an assistant professor of computer science at Harvard University in 1992, and an associate professor in 1997. She held endowed chairs as a Gordon McKay Professor of Computer Science in 2000, and as the Herchel Smith Professor of Computer Science in 2004. From 2005 to 2010, Seltzer was designated a Harvard College Professor in recognition of "particularly distinguished contributions to undergraduate teaching." Seltzer was the Associate Dean of the School of Engineering and Applied Sciences from 2002 to 2006, and an advisor to the Harvard Undergraduate Women in Computer Science.

In September 2018, Seltzer joined the faculty at the University of British Columbia Department of Computer Science as the Canada 150 Research Chair in Computer Systems and the Cheriton Family Chair in Computer Science. In February 2019, she was elected a member of the National Academy of Engineering.

=== Business ===
Seltzer co-founded Sleepycat Software (developers of the Berkeley DB embedded database) in 1996 and was the CTO until 2006, when the company was acquired by Oracle Corporation. She served as an architect on the Oracle Berkeley DB team for several years before transferring to Oracle Labs where she continues to act as an architect.

Seltzer was a director of USENIX from 2005 to 2014, serving as vice president for one year and president for two. In 2019, she received the USENIX Lifetime Achievement Award for her seminal work on Berkeley DB and provenance systems and her dedication to the USENIX community at large.

In 2011, Seltzer was made a Fellow of the Association for Computing Machinery in recognition of "outstanding accomplishments in computing and information technology and/or outstanding service to ACM and the larger computing community." In July 2020, Seltzer accepted the SIGMOD Software Systems award on behalf of the Sleepycat Software team.

== Personal life ==
She is married to software developer Keith Bostic.
