= Elizabeth O'Neil =

American computer scientist

Elizabeth Jean (Betty) O'Neil is an American computer scientist known for her highly cited work in databases, including C-Store, the LRU-K page replacement algorithm, the log-structured merge-tree, and her criticism of the ANSI SQL 92 isolation mechanism. She is a professor of computer science at the University of Massachusetts Boston.

== Education and career ==
O'Neil is a 1963 graduate of the Massachusetts Institute of Technology, majoring in applied mathematics. She completed a Ph.D. in applied mathematics at Harvard University in 1968. Her dissertation was A quasi-linear theory for axially symmetric flows in a stratified rotating fluid. After postdoctoral research at the Courant Institute of Mathematical Sciences of New York University, and short-term teaching positions at New York University and the Massachusetts Institute of Technology, she joined the faculty of the University of Massachusetts Boston in 1970.

== Book ==
O'Neil is the author, with Patrick O'Neil, of the book Database: Principles, Programming, Performance (Morgan Kaufmann, 2nd ed., 2001).
