= JanusGraph =

Graph database

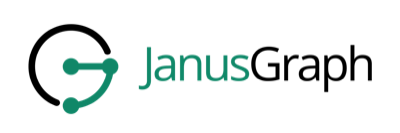
- Release: May 3, 2017; 9 years ago.
- Stable release: 1.1.0 / 9 November 2024
- Written in: Java
- Available in: Java
- Type: Graph database
- License: Apache License 2.0
- Website: janusgraph.org
- Repository: https://github.com/JanusGraph/janusgraph/

JanusGraph is an open source, distributed graph database under The Linux Foundation. JanusGraph is available under the Apache License 2.0. The project is supported by IBM, Google, Hortonworks and Grakn Labs.

JanusGraph supports various storage backends (Apache Cassandra, Apache HBase, Google Cloud Bigtable, Oracle BerkeleyDB, ScyllaDB). The Scalability of JanusGraph depends on the underlying technologies, which are used with JanusGraph. For example, by using Apache Cassandra as a storage backend scaling to multiple datacenters is provided out of the box.

JanusGraph supports global graph data analytics, reporting, and ETL through integration with big data platforms (Apache Spark, Apache Giraph, Apache Hadoop).

JanusGraph supports geo, numeric range, and full-text search via external index storages (ElasticSearch, Apache Solr, Apache Lucene).

JanusGraph has native integration with the Apache TinkerPop graph stack (Gremlin graph query language, Gremlin graph server, Gremlin applications).

== History ==
JanusGraph is the fork of TitanDB graph database which is being developed since 2012.

- Version 0.1.0 was released on Apr 20, 2017.
- Version 0.1.1 was released on May 16, 2017.
- Version 0.2.0 was released on Oct 12, 2017.
- Version 0.2.1 was released on Jul 10, 2018.
- Version 0.2.2 was released on Oct 9, 2018.
- Version 0.2.3 was released on May 21, 2019.
- Version 0.3.0 was released on Jul 31, 2018.
- Version 0.3.1 was released on Oct 2, 2018.
- Version 0.3.2 was released on Jun 16, 2019.
- Version 0.3.3 was released on Jan 11, 2020.
- Version 0.4.0 was released on Jul 1, 2019.
- Version 0.4.1 was released on Jan 14, 2020.
- Version 0.5.0 was released on Mar 10, 2020.
- Version 0.5.1 was released on Mar 25, 2020.
- Version 0.5.2 was released on May 3, 2020.
- Version 0.5.3 was released on December 24, 2020.
- Version 0.6.0 was released on September 3, 2021.
- Version 0.6.1 was released on January 18, 2022.
- Version 0.6.3 was released on February 18, 2023.
- Version 1.0.0 was released on October 21, 2023.
- Version 1.1.0 was released on November 9, 2024,

== Licensing and contributions ==
JanusGraph is available under Apache Software License 2.0.

For contributions an individual or an organisation must sign a CLA paper.

== Literature ==
- Kelvin R. Lawrence. PRACTICAL GREMLIN An Apache TinkerPop Tutorial. Version 282-preview. - February 2019, pp. 324 – 363.

== Publications ==
- Gabriel Campero Durand, Jingy Ma, Marcus Pinnecke, Gunter Saake: Piecing together large puzzles, efficiently: Towards scalable loading into graph database systems, May 2018
- Hima Karanam, Sumit Neelam, Udit Sharma, Sumit Bhatia, Srikanta Bedathur, L. Venkata Subramaniam, Maria Chang, Achille Fokoue-Nkoutche, Spyros Kotoulas, Bassem Makni, Mariano Rodriguez Muro, Ryan Musa, Michael Witbrock: Scalable Reasoning Infrastructure for Large Scale Knowledge Bases, October 2018
- Gabriel Campero Durand, Anusha Janardhana, Marcus Pinnecke, Yusra Shakeel, Jacob Krüger, Thomas Leich, Gunter Saake: Exploring Large Scholarly Networks with Hermes
- Gabriel Tanase, Toyotaro Suzumura, Jinho Lee, Chun-Fu (Richard) Chen, Jason Crawford, Hiroki Kanezashi: System G Distributed Graph Database
- Bogdan Iancu, Tiberiu Marian Georgescu: Saving Large Semantic Data in Cloud: A Survey of the Main DBaaS Solutions
- Jingyi Ma. An Evaluation of the Design Space for Scalable Data Loading into Graph Databases - February 2018, pp. 39–47.
