= Mobile database =

Mobile computing devices (e.g., smartphones and PDAs) store and share data over a mobile network, or access a database which is actually stored by the mobile device. This could be a list of contacts, price information, distance travelled, or any other information.

Many applications require the ability to download information from an information repository and operate on this information even when out of range or disconnected. An example of this is accessing your contacts and calendar on a mobile phone. In this scenario, a user would require access to update information from files in the home directories on a server or customer records from a database. This type of access and work load generated by such users is different from the traditional workloads seen in client–server systems of today.

Mobile databases are not used solely for the revision of company contacts and calendars, but are also utilized in a number of industries.

== Considerations ==
- Mobile users must be able to work without a network connection due to poor or even non-existent connections. A cache could be maintained to hold recently accessed data and transactions so that they are not lost due to connection failure. Users might not require access to truly live data, only recently modified data, and uploading of changes might be deferred until reconnected.
- Bandwidth must be conserved (a common requirement on wireless networks that charge per megabyte or data transferred).
- Mobile computing devices tend to have slower CPUs and limited battery life.
- Users with multiple devices (e.g. smartphone and tablet) need to synchronize their devices to a centralized data store. This may require application-specific automation features. In database theory this is known as "replication", and mobile database system should provide tools for automatic replication that takes into account that others may have modified the same data and support "merge" of variants.
- Users may change location geographically and on the network. Usually dealing with this is left to the operating system, which is responsible for maintaining the wireless network connection.

== Products ==
Commercially available mobile databases include those shown on this comparison chart.

Name	Developer	Type	Sync Central	Sync P2P	Description	License
Couchbase Lite	Couchbase	JSON Document	Yes	Yes	Embedded/portable database, can synchronize with multiple stationary database and/or mobile devices.	Apache 2.0 License
GUN (Graph Universe Node)	ERA Inc	Graph database	Yes	Yes	Enables offline-first, real-time, and decentralized data synchronization between web browsers and JavaScript runtimes.	MIT License, Apache 2.0, zlib License
InterBase	Embarcadero Technologies	Relational	Dependent	Dependent	IoT embedded/portable database, can synchronize with multiple stationary database and/or mobile devices	Proprietary
SQL Anywhere	Sybase iAnywhere	Relational	Dependent	No	Embedded/portable database, can synchronize with stationary database	Proprietary
DB2 Everyplace	IBM	Relational	Dependent	No	Portable, can synchronize with stationary database	Proprietary EULA
SQL Server Compact	Microsoft	Relational	No	No	Small-footprint embedded/portable database for Microsoft Windows mobile devices and desktops, supports synchronization with Microsoft SQL Server	Proprietary
SQL Server Express	Microsoft	Relational	No	No	Embedded database, free download	Proprietary
Oracle Database Lite	Oracle Corporation	Relational	No	No	Portable, can synchronize with stationary database	Proprietary
SQLite	D. Richard Hipp	Relational	No	No	C programming library	Public domain
SQLBase	Gupta Technologies LLC of Redwood Shores, California		No	No		Proprietary
Sparksee	Sparsity Technologies	Graph Database	No	No	Graph database written in C++.	Proprietary

== See also ==
- Cloud computing
