= Berkeley DB =

Software library providing embedded database for key–value data

- Original authors: Margo Seltzer and Keith Bostic of Sleepycat Software
- Developers: Sleepycat Software, later Oracle Corporation
- Release: 1994; 32 years ago
- Stable release: 18.1.40 / May 29, 2020; 6 years ago
- Written in: C
- Operating system: Windows, Unix-like
- Size: ~1244 kB compiled on Windows x86
- Type: Embedded database, NoSQL database
- License: Dual licensed (GNU Affero General Public License and proprietary license
- Website: www.oracle.com/database/technologies/related/berkeleydb.html

Berkeley DB (BDB) is an embedded database software library for key–value data, historically significant in open-source software. Berkeley DB is written in C, with API bindings for many other programming languages. BDB stores arbitrary key–data pairs as byte arrays and supports multiple data items for a single key. Berkeley DB is not a relational database, although it has database features, including database transactions, multiversion concurrency control and write-ahead logging. BDB runs on a wide variety of operating systems, including most Unix-like and Windows systems, and real-time operating systems.

BDB was commercially supported and developed by Sleepycat Software from 1996 to 2006. Sleepycat Software was acquired by Oracle Corporation in February 2006, who continued to develop and sell the C Berkeley DB library. In 2013, Oracle re-licensed BDB under the AGPL license and released new versions until May 2020. Bloomberg L.P. continues to develop a fork of the 2013 version of BDB within their Comdb2 database, under the original Sleepycat permissive license.

== Origin ==
Berkeley DB originated at the University of California, Berkeley as part of BSD, Berkeley's version of the Unix operating system. After 4.3BSD (1986), the BSD developers attempted to remove or replace all code originating in the original AT&T Unix from which BSD was derived. In doing so, they needed to rewrite the Unix dbm database package. Seltzer and Yigit created a new database, unencumbered by any AT&T patents: an on-disk hash table that outperformed the existing dbm libraries. Berkeley DB itself was first released in 1991 and later included with 4.4BSD. In 1996 Netscape requested that the authors of Berkeley DB improve and extend the library, then at version 1.86, to suit Netscape's requirements for an LDAP server and for use in the Netscape browser. That request led to the creation of Sleepycat Software. This company was acquired by Oracle Corporation in February 2006.

Berkeley DB 1.x releases focused on managing key–value data storage and are referred to as "Data Store" (DS). The 2.x releases added a locking system enabling concurrent access to data. This is what is known as "Concurrent Data Store" (CDS). The 3.x releases added a logging system for transactions and recovery, called "Transactional Data Store" (TDS). The 4.x releases added the ability to replicate log records and create a distributed highly available single-master multi-replica database. This is called the "High Availability" (HA) feature set. Berkeley DB's evolution has sometimes led to minor API changes or log format changes, but very rarely have database formats changed. Berkeley DB HA supports online upgrades from one version to the next by maintaining the ability to read and apply the prior release's log records.

Starting with the 6.0.21 (Oracle 12c) release, all Berkeley DB products are licensed under the GNU AGPL. Previously, Berkeley DB was redistributed under the 4-clause BSD license (before version 2.0), and the Sleepycat Public License, which is an OSI-approved open-source license and an FSF-approved free software license. The product ships with complete source code, build script, test suite, and documentation. The comprehensive feature along with the licensing terms have led to its use in a multitude of free and open-source software. Those who do not wish to abide by the terms of the GNU AGPL, or use an older version with the Sleepycat Public License, have the option of purchasing another proprietary license for redistribution from Oracle Corporation. This technique is called dual licensing.

Berkeley DB includes compatibility interfaces for some historic Unix database libraries: dbm, ndbm and hsearch (a System V and POSIX library for creating in-memory hash tables).

== Architecture ==
Berkeley DB has an architecture notably simpler than relational database management systems. Like SQLite and LMDB, it is not based on a client–server model, and does not provide support for network access – programs access the database using in-process API calls. Oracle added support for SQL in 11g R2 release based on the popular SQLite API by including a version of SQLite in Berkeley DB (it uses Berkeley DB for storage).

A program accessing the database is free to decide how the data is to be stored in a record. Berkeley DB puts no constraints on the record's data. The record and its key can both be up to four gigabytes long.

Berkeley DB supports database features such as ACID transactions, fine-grained locking, hot backups and replication.

== Oracle Corporation use of name "Berkeley DB" ==
The name "Berkeley DB" is used by Oracle Corporation for three different products, only one of which is BDB:

1. Berkeley DB, the C database library that is the subject of this article
2. Berkeley DB Java Edition, a pure Java library whose design is modelled after the C library but is otherwise unrelated
3. Berkeley DB XML, a C++ program that supports XQuery, and which includes a legacy version of the C database library

== Open-source programs still using Berkeley DB ==
BDB was once very widespread, but usage dropped steeply from 2013 (see licensing section). Notable software that still uses Berkeley DB for data storage include:

- Bogofilter – A free/open-source spam filter that saves its wordlists using Berkeley DB by default.
- Citadel/UX – A collaborative software (messaging and groupware) that is directly descended from the Citadel family of programs, which became popular in the 1980s and 1990s as a bulletin board system platform. Citadel still supports Berkeley DB for existing sites, but now uses LMDB for new installations.
- Exim - A free/open-source MTA used on Unix-like operating systems.
- Sendmail – A free/open-source MTA, first released in 1983 for Linux/Unix systems.
- Spamassassin – A free/open-source anti-spam application.

Open-source operating systems and languages such as Perl and Python still support old Berkeley DB interfaces. The FreeBSD and OpenBSD operating systems ship Berkeley DB 1.8x to support the dbopen() operating system call used by password programs such as pwb_mkdb. Linux operating systems, including those based on Debian, and Fedora ship Berkeley DB 5.3 libraries.

== Licensing ==
Berkeley DB V2.0 and higher is available under a dual license:

1. Oracle commercial license
2. Open source license
  - Berkeley DB
    - V2.0 - V6.0.19 is licensed under the Sleepycat License
    - V6.0.20 and newer is licensed under the GNU AGPL v3.

Switching the open source license in 2013 from the Sleepycat license to the AGPL had a major effect on open source software. Since BDB is a library, any application linking to it must be under an AGPL-compatible license. Many open source applications and all closed source applications would need to be relicensed to become AGPL-compatible, which was not acceptable to many developers and open source operating systems. By 2013 there were many alternatives to BDB, and Debian Linux was typical in their decision to completely phase out Berkeley DB, with a preference for the Lightning Memory-Mapped Database (LMDB).

== See also ==
- Ordered key–value store
- VSAM
