= WiredTiger =

- Original author: WiredTiger Inc.
- Release: 2012
- Stable release: 11.3.1 / 15 November 2024; 21 months ago
- Written in: C
- Operating system: Cross-platform
- Available in: English
- Type: NoSQL
- Website: wiredtiger.com
- Repository: github.com/wiredtiger/wiredtiger

WiredTiger is a NoSQL, open source extensible platform for data management. It is released under version 2 or 3 of the GNU General Public License. WiredTiger uses multiversion concurrency control (MVCC) architecture.

== Details ==
MongoDB acquired WiredTiger Inc. on December 16, 2014. The WiredTiger storage engine was available in MongoDB 2.8.0 RC2 and was to be included with MongoDB 3.0 and MongoDB Enterprise 3.0. Early WiredTiger users included Amazon and Connectifier. The WiredTiger storage engine is the default storage engine starting in MongoDB version 3.2. It provides a document-level concurrency model, checkpointing, and compression, among other features. In MongoDB Enterprise, WiredTiger also supports encryption at rest.

== See also ==
- Ordered key–value store
