= Sleepycat Software =

American software company

Sleepycat Software, Inc.
- Type: Private company
- Industry: Computer software
- Genre: Database software
- Founded: 1997
- Founder: Margo Seltzer and Keith Bostic
- Defunct: 2006
- Fate: Acquired
- Successor: Oracle Corporation
- Headquarters: Lincoln, Massachusetts, U.S.
- Key people: Michael Olson (CEO)
- Products: Berkeley DB

Sleepycat Software, Inc. was the software company primarily responsible for maintaining the Berkeley DB packages from 1996 to 2006.

== Company ==
Berkeley DB is freely-licensed database software originally developed at the University of California, Berkeley for 4.4BSD Unix. Developers from that project founded Sleepycat in 1996 to provide commercial support after a request by Netscape to provide new features in the software. In February 2006, Sleepycat was acquired by Oracle Corporation, which continued developing Berkeley DB.

The founders of the company were spouses Margo Seltzer and Keith Bostic, who are also original authors of Berkeley DB. Another original author, Michael Olson, was the president and CEO of Sleepycat. They attended University of California, Berkeley, where they developed the software that grew to become Berkeley DB. Sleepycat was originally based in Carlisle, Massachusetts and in 2000 moved to Lincoln, Massachusetts.

Sleepycat distributed Berkeley DB under a proprietary software license that included standard commercial features, and simultaneously under the newly created Sleepycat License, which allows open source use and distribution of Berkeley DB with a copyleft redistribution condition similar to the GNU General Public License.

Sleepycat had offices in California, Massachusetts, and the United Kingdom, and was profitable during its entire existence.

== See also ==
- Berkeley Software Design
- Computer Systems Research Group
