= Key–value database =

Data storage paradigm

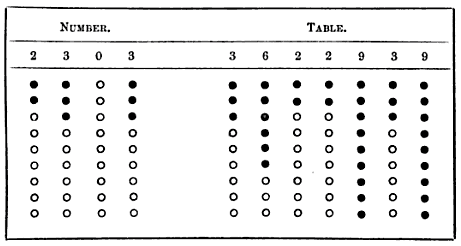
A tabular data card proposed for Babbage's Analytical Engine showing a key–value pair, in this instance a number and its base-ten logarithm

A key-value database, or key-value store, is a data storage paradigm designed for storing, retrieving, and managing associative arrays, a data structure more commonly known today as a dictionary. Dictionaries contain a collection of objects, or records, which in turn have many different fields within them. These records are stored and retrieved using a key that uniquely identifies the record, and is used to find the data within the database.

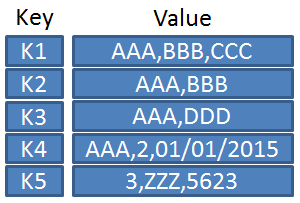
A table showing different formatted data values associated with different keys

A lack of standardization, limited transaction support, and relatively simple query interfaces long restricted many key-value systems to specialized uses, but the rapid move to cloud computing after 2010 helped drive renewed interest in them as part of the broader NoSQL movement. Some graph databases, such as ArangoDB, are also key–value databases internally, adding the concept of relationships (pointers) between records as a first-class data type.

== Definition ==
Key-value databases differ from the better known relational databases (RDB). RDBs pre-define the data structure in the database as a series of tables containing fields with well-defined data types. Exposing the data types to the database program allows it to apply various optimizations. In contrast, key-value systems treat the value as opaque to the database itself, and typically support only simple operations such as storing, retrieving, updating, and deleting a value by its key. This offers considerable flexibility and makes such systems well suited to low-latency, high-throughput workloads dominated by direct key lookups, but less suitable for applications that require complex queries or explicit relationships among records. Being opaque means that keys are not subject to search criteria, relations, or referential integrity constraints. Opaqueness is what distinguishes key–value DBMSs from document databases. A document DBMS can interpret the structure of a record, whereas a key–value DBMS treats each value as an opaque object that can only be retrieved in its entirety by its associated key, rather than querying by and retrieving individual fields. This distinction remains even if a document DBMS provides an identifier field that allows documents to be retrieved in the same manner as a key–value DBMS. Some key–value DBMSs do support complex value types; for example, Redis supports lists.

== Types and examples ==
Key–value systems span a wide consistency spectrum, from eventually consistent designs to strongly consistent or serializable ones, and some allow the consistency level to be configured as part of the trade-off against latency and availability. Renewed interest in key–value and other NoSQL systems was driven in part by the demands of big data, distributed, and cloud applications. Their scalability and availability made them attractive for cloud data management, although limited transaction support, low-level query interfaces, and the lack of standardization remained obstacles to wider adoption. Some maintain data in memory (RAM), while others employ solid-state drives or rotating disks.

Some key–value systems add additional structure to their keys. For example, Oracle NoSQL Database organizes records using composite keys with "major" and "minor" components, an arrangement that Oracle compares to a directory-path structure in a file system. More generally, however, key–value stores are defined by their use of unique keys associated with opaque values and by their emphasis on simple key-based operations.

Unix included dbm (database manager), a minimal database library written by Ken Thompson for managing associative arrays with a single key and hash-based access. Later implementations and related libraries included sdbm, GNU dbm (gdbm), and Berkeley DB.

A more recent example is RocksDB, a persistent key–value storage engine developed at Facebook and designed for large-scale applications. Other examples include in-memory systems such as Memcached and Redis, and persistent systems such as Berkeley DB, Riak, and Voldemort.

== See also ==
- Data analysis
- Document-oriented database
- Multi-model database
- Tuple space
- Ordered key–value store
- Name–value pair
