= List of NoSQL software and tools =

This is a list of software and programming tools for NoSQL databases, including database engines, database administration tools, IDEs, migration tools, and related projects.

== NoSQL database engines ==
=== Document stores ===
- Apache CouchDB
- Couchbase Server
- LiteDB
- MarkLogic Server
- MongoDB
- RavenDB
- RethinkDB
- TinyDB

=== Key–value stores ===
- Aerospike
- Bitcask
- Oracle NoSQL Database
- Redis
- Riak
- Tarantool
- Valkey

=== Wide-column stores ===
- Apache Accumulo
- Apache Cassandra
- Apache HBase
- Apache IoTDB
- Azure Tables
- Google Cloud Bigtable
- DataStax
- Hypertable
- ScyllaDB

=== Graph databases ===
- AllegroGraph
- Amazon Neptune
- ArangoDB
- Blazegraph
- FlockDB
- GUN
- InfiniteGraph
- JanusGraph
- Neo4j
- NitrosBase
- Oracle Spatial and Graph
- OrientDB
- Sones GraphDB
- Sparksee
- TerminusDB
- TigerGraph
- TypeDB
- Vadalog

=== Multi-model and other types ===
- DynamoDB
- FoundationDB
- Rasdaman
- SciDB
- SequoiaDB
- TimescaleDB
- Virtuoso Universal Server
- VoltDB

== Database clients and management tools ==
- Compass — official MongoDB GUI client
- DataGrip
- NoSQL Workbench
- VisuaLeaf
- Studio 3T
- Oxide Mongo

== NoSQL development frameworks ==
- Firebase Realtime Database — Google’s platform for building mobile and web real-time data storage apps
- GUN — decentralized graph database and real-time data synchronization engine
- Realm — mobile database and synchronization framework for iOS and Android

== Database migration and version control ==
- Flyway — supports migration for some NoSQL databases
- Liquibase — database change management supporting NoSQL systems

== Database drivers and ORMs ==
- JDBC — Java connectivity for some NoSQL databases
- ODBC — Open Database Connectivity for some NoSQL systems
- Spring Data — Java framework supporting NoSQL
- Hibernate OGM — Hibernate extension for NoSQL

== Data analysis and visualization ==
- Apache Superset — modern data exploration and visualization
- Grafana — visualization and analytics platform supporting NoSQL data sources
- Metabase — open-source business intelligence for NoSQL
- Power BI — supports connectors for NoSQL databases
- Redash — query and visualization tool supporting NoSQL
- Tableau — supports NoSQL connectors

== Testing and performance tools ==
- Gatling — load testing framework that supports NoSQL backends
- HammerDB — supports benchmarking of some NoSQL databases
- YCSB — Yahoo! Cloud Serving Benchmark for NoSQL databases

== Backup, replication, and high availability ==
- SymmetricDS — supports database replication including NoSQL
- Percona Backup for MongoDB — backup tool for MongoDB
- Redis Enterprise Backup — backup solution for Redis
- MongoDB Atlas — managed cloud service with built-in backup and global replication
- Scylla Manager — management and backup tool for ScyllaDB

== See also ==
- Comparison of database administration tools
- Database management system
- DB-Engine Ranking list
- Elasticsearch
- List of relational database management systems
- List of SQL software and tools
- List of time series databases
- NewSQL
- Vector database
