= Comparison of structured storage software =

Structured storage is computer storage for structured data, often in the form of a distributed database. Computer software formally known as structured storage systems include Apache Cassandra, Google's Bigtable and Apache HBase.

== Comparison ==
The following is a comparison of notable structured storage systems.

Project name	Type	Persistence	Replication	High Availability	Transactions	Rack-locality Awareness	Implementation Language	Influences, Sponsors	License
Aerospike	NoSQL database	Yes, Hybrid DRAM and flash for persistence	Yes	Yes, Distributed for scale	Yes	Yes	C (small bits of assembly language)	Aerospike	AGPL v3
AllegroGraph	Graph database	Yes	No - v5, 2010	Yes	Yes	No	Common Lisp	Franz Inc.	Proprietary
Apache Ignite	Key-value	To and from an underlying persistent storage (e.g. an RDBMS)	Yes	Yes	Yes	Yes	Java	Apache, GridGain Systems	Apache 2.0
Apache Jackrabbit	Key-value & Hierarchical & Document	Yes	Yes	Yes	Yes	likely	Java	Apache, Roy Fielding, Day Software	Apache 2.0
Berkeley DB/Dbm 1.x	Key-value	Yes	No	No	No	No	C	old school	Various
Berkeley DB Sleepycat/Oracle Berkeley DB 5.x	Key-value	Yes	Yes	Yes	Yes	No	C, C++, or Java	dbm, Sleepycat/Oracle	dual GPL-like Sleepycat License
Apache Cassandra	Key-value	Yes	Yes	Distributed	Partial Only supports CAS (Check And Set) after 2.1.1 and later	Yes	Java	Dynamo and Bigtable, Facebook/Digg/Rackspace	Apache 2.0
ClustrixDB	scale-out relational	Yes	Yes	Distributed and Replication	Yes	No	C	Clustrix	Proprietary
Coherence	Key-value	Persistent data typically in an RDBMS	Yes	Yes	Yes	Yes	Java	Oracle (previously Tangosol)	Proprietary
Oracle NoSQL Database	Key-value	Yes	Yes	Yes	Yes	No	Java	Oracle	AGPLv3 License or proprietary
Couchbase	Document	Yes	Yes	Yes	Yes, with two-phase commits	Yes	C++, Erlang, C, Go	CouchDB, Memcached	Apache 2.0
CouchDB	Document	Yes	Yes	replication + load balancing	Atomicity is per document, per CouchDB instance	No	Erlang	Lotus Notes / Ubuntu, Mozilla, IBM	Apache 2.0
Extensible Storage Engine(ESE/NT)	Document or Key-value	Yes	No	No	Yes	No	C++, Assembly	Microsoft	Proprietary
FoundationDB	Ordered Key-value	Yes	Yes	Yes	Yes	Depends on user configuration	C++	FoundationDB	Proprietary
GT.M	Key-value	Yes	Yes	Yes	Yes	Depends on user configuration	C (small bits of assembly language)	FIS	AGPL v3
Project name	Type	Persistence	Replication	High Availability	Transactions	Rack-locality Awareness	Implementation Language	Influences, Sponsors	License
Apache HBase	Key-value	Yes. Major version upgrades require re-import.	Yes HDFS, Amazon S3 or Amazon Elastic Block Store.	Yes	Yes	See HDFS, S3 or EBS.	Java	Bigtable	Apache 2.0
Information Management System IBM IMS aka DB1	Key-value. Multi-level	Yes	Yes	Yes, with HALDB	Yes, with IMS TM	Unknown	Assembler	IBM since 1966	Proprietary
Infinispan	Key-value	Yes	Yes	Yes	Yes	Yes	Java	Red Hat	Apache 2.0
Memcached	Key-value	No	No	No	Partial Only supports CAS (Check And Set - or Compare And Swap)	No	C	Six Apart/Couchbase/Fotolog/Facebook	BSD-like permissive copyright by Danga
LevelDB	Key-value, Bigtable	Yes	No	No	Partial Multiple writes can be combined into single operation	No	C++	Google	New BSD License
LightningDB	Key-value, memory-mapped files	Yes	No	No	Yes, ACID, MVCC	No	C	Symas	OpenLDAP Public License
MongoDB	Document (JSON)	Yes	Yes	fail-over	Partial Single document atomicity	No	C++	10gen	GNU AGPL v3.0
Neo4j	Graph database	Yes	Yes	Yes	Yes	No	Java	Neo Technology	GNU GPL v3.0
OrientDB	Multi-Model (Graph-Document-Object-Key/Value)	Yes	Yes	Yes	Yes	Yes	Java	Orient Technologies	Apache 2.0
Redis	Key-value	Yes. But last few queries can be lost.	Yes	Yes	Yes	No	Ansi-C	VMWare, Memcache	BSD
ScyllaDB	Key-value	Yes	Yes	Distributed and Replication	No	Unknown	C++	Apache Cassandra	AGPL v3
SimpleDB (Amazon.com)	Document & Key-value	Yes	Yes (automatic)	Yes	Unknown	likely	Erlang	Amazon.com	Amazon internal only
Tarantool	Free-dimensional tuples with primary and secondary keys	Yes. (Asynchronous)	Yes	Yes	Yes	No	C, Lua	Memcached, Mnesia, MySQL, Mail.ru	BSD
Project name	Type	Persistence	Replication	High Availability	Transactions	Rack-locality Awareness	Implementation Language	Influences, Sponsors	License

== See also ==
- NoSQL
