= MarkLogic Server =

- Developer: MarkLogic
- Written in: C, C++, JavaScript
- Available in: English
- Type: Document-oriented database
- Website: www.progress.com/marklogic/server

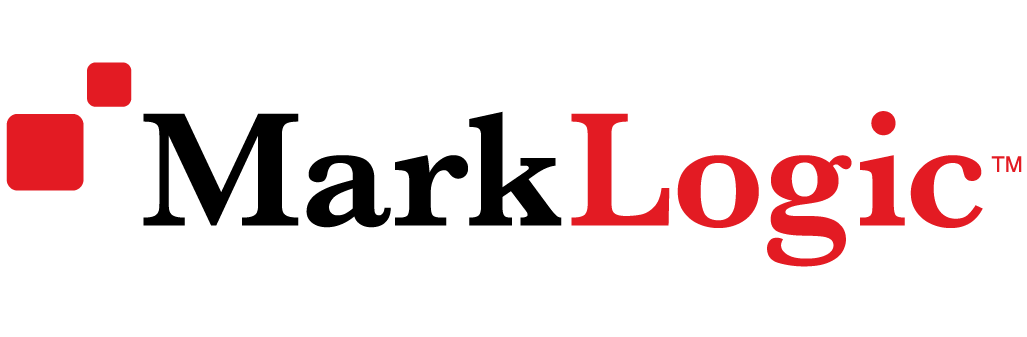

MarkLogic Server is a document-oriented database developed by MarkLogic. It is a NoSQL multi-model database that evolved from an XML database to natively store JSON documents and RDF triples, the data model for semantics. MarkLogic is designed to be a data hub for operational and analytical data.

== History ==
MarkLogic Server was built to address shortcomings with existing search and data products. The product first focused on using XML as the document markup standard and XQuery as the query standard for accessing collections of documents up to hundreds of terabytes in size.

Currently the MarkLogic platform is widely used in publishing, government, finance and other sectors. MarkLogic's customers are mostly Global 2000 companies.

== Technology ==
MarkLogic uses documents without upfront schemas to maintain a flexible data model. In addition to having a flexible data model, MarkLogic uses a distributed, scale-out architecture that can handle hundreds of billions of documents and hundreds of terabytes of data. It has received Common Criteria certification, and has high availability and disaster recovery. MarkLogic is designed to run on-premises and within public or private cloud environments like Amazon Web Services.

== Features ==
Indexing

MarkLogic indexes the content and structure of documents including words, phrases, relationships, and values in over 200 languages with tokenization, collation, and stemming for core languages. Functionality includes the ability to toggle range indexes, geospatial indexes, the RDF triple index, and reverse indexes on or off based on your data, the kinds of queries that you will run, and your desired performance.

Full-text search

MarkLogic supports search across its data and metadata using a word or phrase and incorporates Boolean logic, stemming, wildcards, case sensitivity, punctuation sensitivity, diacritic sensitivity, and search term weighting. Data can be searched using JavaScript, XQuery, SPARQL, and SQL.

Semantics

MarkLogic uses RDF triples to provide semantics for ease of storing metadata and querying.

ACID

Unlike other NoSQL databases, MarkLogic maintains ACID consistency for transactions.

Replication

MarkLogic provides high availability with replica sets.

Scalability

MarkLogic scales horizontally using sharding.

MarkLogic can run over multiple servers, balancing the load or replicating data to keep the system up and running in the event of hardware failure.

Security

MarkLogic has built in security features such as element-level permissions and data redaction.

Optic API for Relational Operations

An API that lets developers view their data as documents, graphs or rows.

Security

MarkLogic provides redaction, encryption, and element-level security (allowing for control on read and write rights on parts of a document).

== Applications ==
- Banking
- Big Data
- Fraud prevention
- Insurance Claims Management and Underwriting
- Master data management
- Recommendation engines

== Licensing ==
MarkLogic is available under various licensing and delivery models, namely a free Developer or an Essential Enterprise license.[3] Licenses are available from MarkLogic or directly from cloud marketplaces such as Amazon Web Services and Microsoft Azure.

== Releases ==
- 2001 – Cerisent XQE 1: ACID transactions, Full-text search, XML Storage, XQuery, Role-based security
- 2004 – Cerisent XQE 2: Scale-out architecture, Enhanced search (stemming, thesaurus, wildcard), Backup and restore
- 2005 – MarkLogic Server 3: Continuing search improvements, Content Processing Framework (including PDF, Word, Excel, PPT), Failover
- 2008 – MarkLogic Server 4: Geospatial search, entity extraction, advanced XQuery, performance, scalability enhancements, auditing
- 2011 – MarkLogic Server 5: Flexible replication / DDIL, real-time indexing, advanced search, improved analytics, concurrency enhancements
- 2012 – MarkLogic Server 6: REST and Java APIs, App Builder, enhanced UI, improved search
- 2013 – MarkLogic Server 7: Semantic graph, bitemporal data, tiered storage, improved search, better management
- 2015 – MarkLogic Server 8: A Native JSON storage, Server-side JavaScript, Bitemporal, Node.js client API, Incremental backup, Flexible replication[16]
- 2017 – MarkLogic Server 9: Data integration across Relational and Non-Relational data, Advanced Encryption, Element Level Security, Redaction
- 2019 – MarkLogic Server 10: Enhanced Data Hub, improved SQL, security, analytics performance, cloud support
- 2022 – MarkLogic Server 11: MarkLogic Ops Director (Monitoring and Administration Improvements), expanded PKI
- 2025 – MarkLogic Server 12: Generative AI and Native Vector Search, Graph Algorithm Support, Virtual TDEs (relational views on the fly)

== See also ==
- Document database
- Graph database
- Multi-model database
- NoSQL
- Triple store
- MongoDB
- Operational data store
- Online analytical processing
- Resource description framework
