= MarkLogic =

American software company

Progress MarkLogic
- Type: Public
- Industry: Software
- Founded: 2001; 25 years ago
- Founder: Christopher Lindblad
- Headquarters: Burlington, Massachusetts, United States
- Key people: Yogesh Gupta (President & CEO)
- Products: MarkLogic licenses, support, and consulting services
- Revenue: ▲$100 Million
- Owner: Independent (2001–20); Vector Capital (2020–23); Progress Software (2023–present)
- Number of employees: 500
- Website: www.progress.com/marklogic

MarkLogic is an American software business that develops and provides an enterprise NoSQL database, which is also named MarkLogic. They have offices in the United States, Europe, Asia, and Australia.

In February 2023, MarkLogic was acquired by Progress Software for $355 million.

== Overview ==
Founded in 2001 by Christopher Lindblad and Paul Pedersen, MarkLogic Corporation is a privately held company with over 500 employees that was acquired by Vector Capital in October 2020.

== History ==
MarkLogic was originally named Cerisent when it was founded in 2001 by Christopher Lindblad, who was the Chief Architect of the Ultraseek search engine at Infoseek, as well as Paul Pedersen, a professor of computer science at Cornell University and UCLA, and Frank R. Caufield, Founder of Darwin Ventures, to address shortcomings with existing search and data products. The product first focused on using XML document markup standard and XQuery as the query standard for accessing collections of documents up to hundreds of terabytes in size.

In 2009, IDC mentioned MarkLogic as one of the top Innovative Information Access Companies with under $100 million in revenue.

In May 2012, Gary Bloom was appointed as Chief Executive Officer. He held senior positions at Symantec Corporation, Veritas Software, and Oracle.

Post-acquisition, the company named Jeffrey Casale as its new CEO.

=== Funding ===
MarkLogic received its first financing of $6 million in 2002 led by Sequoia Capital, followed by a $12 million investment in June 2004, this time led by Lehman Brothers Venture Partners. The company received additional funding of $15 million in 2007 from its existing investors Sequoia and Lehman. The same investors put another $12.5 million into the company in 2009.

On 12 April 2013, MarkLogic received an additional $25 million in funding, led by Sequoia Capital and Tenaya Capital. On May 12, 2015, MarkLogic received an additional $102 million in funding, led by Wellington Management Company, with contributions from Arrowpoint Partners and existing backers, Sequoia Capital, Tenaya Capital, and Northgate Capital. This brought the company's total funding to $173 million and gave MarkLogic a pre-money valuation of $1 billion.

NTT Data announced a strategic investment in MarkLogic on 31 May 2017.

== Products ==
The MarkLogic product is considered a multi-model NoSQL database for its ability to store, manage, search JSON and XML documents and semantic data (RDF triples).

=== Releases ===
- 2001 – Cerisent XQE 1: ACID transactions, Full-text search, XML Storage, XQuery, Role-based security
- 2004 – Cerisent XQE 2: Scale-out architecture, Enhanced search (stemming, thesaurus, wildcard), Backup and restore
- 2005 – MarkLogic Server 3: Continuing search improvements, Content Processing Framework (including PDF, Word, Excel, PPT), Failover
- 2008 – MarkLogic Server 4: Geospatial search, entity extraction, advanced XQuery, performance, scalability enhancements, auditing
- 2011 – MarkLogic Server 5: Flexible replication / DDIL, real-time indexing, advanced search, improved analytics, concurrency enhancements
- 2012 – MarkLogic Server 6: REST and Java APIs, App Builder, enhanced UI, improved search
- 2013 – MarkLogic Server 7: Semantic graph, bitemporal data, tiered storage, improved search, better management
- 2015 – MarkLogic Server 8: A Native JSON storage, Server-side JavaScript, Bitemporal, Node.js client API, Incremental backup, Flexible replication[16]
- 2017 – MarkLogic Server 9: Data integration across Relational and Non-Relational data, Advanced Encryption, Element Level Security, Redaction
- 2019 – MarkLogic Server 10: Enhanced Data Hub, improved SQL, security, analytics performance, cloud support
- 2022 – MarkLogic Server 11: MarkLogic Ops Director (Monitoring and Administration Improvements), expanded PKI
- 2025 – MarkLogic Server 12: Generative AI and Native Vector Search, Graph Algorithm Support, Virtual TDEs (relational views on the fly)

=== Licensing and support ===
MarkLogic is proprietary software, available under a freeware developer software license or a commercial "Essential Enterprise" license. Licenses are available from MarkLogic or directly from cloud marketplaces such as Amazon Web Services and Microsoft Azure.

== Technology ==
MarkLogic is a multi-model NoSQL database that has evolved from its XML database roots to also natively store JSON documents and RDF triples for its semantic data model. It uses a distributed architecture that can handle hundreds of billions of documents and hundreds of terabytes of data. MarkLogic maintains ACID consistency for transactions and has a Common Criteria certification security model, high availability, and disaster recovery. It is designed to run on-premises within public or private cloud computing environments like Amazon Web Services.

MarkLogic's Enterprise NoSQL database platform is used in various sectors, including publishing, government and finance. It is employed in a number of systems currently in production.

== See also ==
- Document database
- Graph database
- Multi-model database
- NoSQL
- Triple store
- MongoDB
