= Strozzi NoSQL =

Strozzi NoSQL (RDBMS)
- Original author: Carlo Strozzi
- Release: 1998
- Stable release: 4.1.11 / June 6, 2014; 12 years ago
- Platform: Unix-like (e.g., Cygwin)
- Type: RDBMS
- License: GPL
- Website: www.strozzi.it/cgi-bin/CSA/tw7/I/en_US/nosql/Home%20Page

Strozzi NoSQL is a shell-based relational database management system initialized and developed by Carlo Strozzi that runs under Unix-like operating systems, or others with compatibility layers (e.g., Cygwin under Windows). Its file name NoSQL merely reflects the fact that it does not express its queries using Structured Query Language; the NoSQL RDBMS is distinct from the circa-2009 general concept of NoSQL databases, which are typically non-relational, unlike the NoSQL RDBMS. Strozzi NoSQL is released under the GNU GPL.

== Construction ==
NoSQL uses the operator-stream paradigm, where a number of "operators" perform a unique function on the passed data. The stream used is supplied by the UNIX input/output redirection system so that over the pipe system, the result of the calculation can be passed to other operators. As UNIX pipes run in memory, it is a very efficient way of implementation.

NoSQL, with development led by Carlo Strozzi, is the latest and perhaps the most active in a line of implementations of the stream-operator database design originally described by Evan Shaffer, Rod Manis, and Robert Jorgensen in a 1991 Unix Review article and an associated paper. Other implementations include the Perl-based RDB, a commercial version by the original authors called /rdb, and Starbase, a version with added astronomical data operators by John Roll of Harvard and the Smithsonian Astrophysical Observatory. Because of its strengths in dealing with pipe data, most implementations are a mixture of awk and other programming languages, usually C or Perl.

The concept was originally described in a 1991 Unix Review article, and later expanded in a paper (see reference above), as well as in the book, "Unix Relational Database Management". NoSQL (along with other similar stream-operator databases) is well-suited to a number of fast, analytical database tasks, and has the significant advantage of keeping the tables in ASCII text form, allowing many powerful text processing tools to be used as an adjunct to the database functions themselves. Popular tools for use with NoSQL include Python, Perl, awk, and shell scripts using the ubiquitous Unix text processing tools (cut, paste, grep, sort, uniq, etc.)

NoSQL is written mostly in interpretive languages, slowing actual process execution, but its ability to use ordinary pipes and filesystems means that it can be extremely fast for many applications when using RAM filesystems or heavily leveraging pipes, which are mostly memory-based in many implementations.

== Philosophy ==
The reasons for avoiding SQL are as follows:

1. Complexity: Most commercial database products are often too costly for minor projects, and free databases are too complex. They also do not have the shell-level approach that NoSQL has.
2. Portability:
  1. Data: The data from NoSQL can be easily ported to other types of machines, like Macintoshes or Windows computers, since tables exist ily read from or redirected to files at any point in processing.
  2. Software: NoSQL can run on any UNIX machine that has the Perl and the AWK programming languages installed, and perhaps even on the Cygwin UNIX-like environment for Microsoft Windows.
3. Unlimited: NoSQL has no arbitrary limits, like a data field size, column number, or file size limit, and can principally work where other products cannot. (The number of columns in a table may actually be limited to 32,768 by some implementations of the AWK1 programming language).
4. Usability: With its straight forward and logical concept, NoSQL can easily be used by non-computer people. For instance, rows of data are selected with the 'row' operator, columns with the 'column' operator.

In contrast to other RDBMS, NoSQL has the full power of UNIX during application development and usage. Its user interface uses the UNIX shell. So, it is not necessary to learn a set of new commands to administer the database. From the view of NoSQL, the database is not more than a set of files similar to any other user file. No scripting or other type of database language is used besides the UNIX shell. This shell-nature encourages casual use of this database, which makes its use familiar, resulting in formal use. In other words, NoSQL is a set of shell routines that access normal files of the operating system.

== Examples ==
To retrieve information about a particular employee, a query in SQL might look like this:

select e.*, a.*, mgr.* from EMPLOYEES e, ADDRESSES a, MANAGERS mgr
WHERE .....

Since a document-oriented NoSQL database often retrieves a pre-connected document representing the entire employee, the query might look like this:

$e = doc("/employee/emp_1234")
return $e/address/zip

The stream-operator paradigm differs from conventional SQL, but since the NoSQL DB is relational, it is possible to map NoSQL operators to their SQL equivalents:

SQL	NoSQL or /rdb
select col1 col2 from filename	column col1 col2 < filename
where column - expression	row ’column == expression’
compute column = expression	compute ’column = expression’
group by	subtotal
having	row
order by column	sorttable column
unique	uniq
count	wc -l
outer join	jointable -al
update	delete, replace
nesting	pipes

== See also ==
- Relational database management system (RDBMS)
