= Ontop =

Payroll and workforce management company

- Type: Private
- Industry: Financial technology, HR Technology
- Founded: August 2020; 6 years ago
- Founders: Julián Torres Gómez, María Camila Ramírez, Jaime Abella Álvarez, Santiago Aparicio
- Headquarters: Miami, Florida, United States
- Area served: Global
- Services: Global payroll, workforce management, digital wallets
- Number of employees: 200 (2025)
- Website: www.getontop.com

Ontop is a Miami-based global payroll and workforce management company founded in 2020 in Bogotá, Colombia. The company provides infrastructure for hiring, managing, and paying international employees and contractors.

== History ==
Ontop was founded in Bogotá, Colombia, in August 2020 by Julián Torres Gómez, María Camila Ramírez, Jaime Abella Álvarez, Santiago Aparicio, and Maria Camila. The company raised US$300,000 in its first weeks of operation.

In March 2021, Ontop was accepted into the Y Combinator W21 batch and secured US$4.5 million during Demo Day in May 2021. In October, it closed a US$20 million Series A round led by Tiger Global and Point72. The company also joined the Endeavor global network in 2021.

In 2023, Ontop raised an additional US$10 million to expand its payroll and financial infrastructure and was included in Y Combinator's “Top Companies 2023” list. In 2024, the company shifted to a single active co-founder, with Julián Torres Gómez becoming chief executive officer. Ontop reached profitability and surpassed US$1 billion in international payments processed in 2025.

== Operations ==
Ontop provides infrastructure for companies to manage and pay their global workforce, with a focus on independent contractors in more than 150 countries. The platform offers services tailored for contractors, including automated contract drafting and finalization, localized legal compliance, onboarding workflows, and global payroll management.

Ontop also has AI tools that automate contract generation, job descriptions, onboarding flows, compliance checks, and operational HR/Finance tasks. It also offers cross-border payment capabilities with multi-currency support and expense administration. Financial services for workers allows access to digital wallet, international transfers, foreign exchange services, and the Ontop Global Card issued by Visa. The company also offers optional engagement and benefits programs, including cashback rewards and wellness-related perks.

Ontop operates globally and employs about 200 people in 25 countries, with headquarters in Miami, United States.
