= Tenaya Capital =

American venture capital firm

- Type: Private
- Industry: Venture capital
- Predecessor: Lehman Brothers Venture Partners
- Founded: 1995
- Headquarters: Woodside, California, United States
- Products: Investments
- Total assets: $750 million
- Website: www.tenayacapital.com

Tenaya Capital is a venture capital firm with offices in Portola Valley, California, and Wellesley, Massachusetts. Founded in 1995 as Lehman Brothers Venture Partners, Tenaya spun out to become an independent firm in 2009 following Lehman's bankruptcy.

== Lehman Brothers bankruptcy and LBVP spin out ==
On September 15, 2008, Lehman Brothers filed for bankruptcy protection. As part of the liquidation process, Lazard was appointed to sell certain interests in Lehman Brothers Venture Partners and its other private investment units.

In January 2009, HarbourVest Partners, a Boston private equity fund of funds, financed the spinout of Tenaya, acquiring Lehman's existing investment and unfunded commitments to Tenaya venture funds.

Tenaya invests in mid-to-late stage companies, and its first fund after its spin out from Lehman Brothers was Tenaya Capital VI, which closed at $372 million.It opened its seventh fund in 2015.

== See also ==
- Lehman Brothers Merchant Banking
