= Sparksee (graph database) =

Graph database system

- Developer: Sparsity Technologies
- Release: 2008
- Stable release: v6.0 / 2021
- Operating system: Cross-platform
- Type: Graph Database
- License: Dual-licensed: personal evaluation use / commercial use
- Website: Sparsity-Technologies:Sparksee

Sparksee (formerly known as DEX) is a high-performance and scalable graph database management system written in C++. From version 6.0, Sparksee has shifted its focus to embedded systems and mobile, becoming the first graph database specialized in mobile platforms with versions for IOS and Android.

Its development started in 2006 and its first version was available in Q3 - 2008. The sixth version has been available since Q2-2021. There is a free community version, for academic or evaluation purposes, available to download, limited to 1 million nodes, with no limit on edges.

Sparksee is a product originated by the research carried out at DAMA-UPC (Data Management group at the Polytechnic University of Catalonia). In March 2010 a spin-off called Sparsity-Technologies was created at the UPC to commercialize and give services to the technologies developed at DAMA-UPC.

DEX changed its name to Sparksee on its 5th release in February 2014.

== Graph model ==
Sparksee is based on a graph database model, which is basically characterized by three properties: data structures are graphs or any other structure similar to a graph; data manipulation and queries are based on graph-oriented operations; and there are data constraints to guarantee the integrity of the data and its relationships.

A Sparksee graph is a labeled-property graph (referred to in the official documentation as Labeled Attributed Multigraph). Labeled because nodes and edges in a graph belong to types. Attributed because both nodes and edges may have attributes and Multigraph means that there may be multiple edges between the same nodes even if they are from the same edge type. It supports both directed edges as well as undirected.

One of its main characteristics is its performance storage and retrieval for large graphs (in the order of billions of nodes, edges and attributes) implemented with specialized structures.

== Technical details ==
- Programming language: C++
- API: Java, .NET, C++, Python, Objective-C
- OS compatibility: Windows, Linux, macOS, iOS, Android
- Persistency: Disk
- Transactions: full ACID
- Recovery Manager
- Encryption
- Open Cypher Query Language

== See also ==
- Graph Database
- NoSQL
