= GUN (graph database) =

Decentralized Graph Database

- Original author: Mark Nadal
- Developer: ERA Inc
- Initial release: 2014; 11 years ago
- Repository: github.com/amark/gun
- Written in: JavaScript
- Type: NoSQL, Graph database, Javascript library
- License: MIT License, Apache 2.0, zlib License
- Website: gun.eco

GUN (also known as Graph Universe Node, gun.js, and gunDB) is an open source, offline-first, real-time, decentralized, graph database written in JavaScript for the web browser.

The database is implemented as a peer-to-peer network distributed across "Browser Peers" and "Runtime Peers". It employs multi-master replication with a custom commutative replicated data type (CRDT).

GUN is currently used in the decentralized version of the Internet Archive.
