= InfiniteGraph =

- Developers: Objectivity, Inc.
- Written in: Java, C++
- Type: Graph database
- License: Proprietary
- Website: infinitegraph.com

InfiniteGraph is a distributed graph database implemented in Java and C++ and is from a class of NOSQL ("Not Only SQL") database technologies that focus on graph data structures. Developers use InfiniteGraph to find useful and often hidden relationships in highly connected, complex big data sets. InfiniteGraph is cross-platform, scalable, cloud-enabled, and is designed to handle very high throughput.

InfiniteGraph can easily and efficiently perform queries that are difficult to perform, such as finding all paths or the shortest path between two items. InfiniteGraph is suited for applications and services that solve graph problems in operational environments. InfiniteGraphs "DO" query language enables both value-based queries and complex graph queries. InfiniteGraph goes beyond graph databases to also support complex object queries.

Adoption is seen in federal government, telecommunications, healthcare, cybersecurity, manufacturing, finance, and networking applications.

== History ==
InfiniteGraph was produced and supported by Objectivity, Inc., a company that develops database management technologies for large-scale, distributed data management and relationship analytics. The new InfiniteGraph was released in May 2021 and a new release was announced in Frebruary 2023. Objectivity, Inc. ceased in late 2023.

== Features ==
- API/Protocols: Java, core C++, REST API
- Graph Model: Labeled directed multigraph. An edge is a first-class entity with an identity independent of the vertices it connects..
- Concurrency: Update locking on subgraphs, concurrent non-blocking ingest.
- Consistency: Flexible (from ACID to relaxed).
- Distribution: Lock server and 64-bit object IDs support dynamic addressing space (with each federation capable of managing up to 65,535 individual databases and 10^24 bytes (one quadrillion gigabytes, or a yottabyte) of physical addressing space).
- Processing: Multi-threaded.
- Query Methods: "DO" Query Language, Traverser and graph navigation API, predicate language qualification, path pattern matching.
- Parallel query support
- Visualization: InfiniteGraph "Studio."
- Schema: Supports schema-full plus provides a mechanism for attaching side data.
- Transactions: Fully ACID.
- Source: Proprietary, with open-source extensions, integrated components, and third-party connectors.
- Platforms: Windows and Linux
