= Perst =

- Developer: McObject
- Initial release: 2003; 23 years ago
- Operating system: Cross-platform
- Type: ODBMS
- License: GPL or proprietary
- Website: www.mcobject.com/perst

Perst is an open source, dual license, object-oriented embedded database management system (ODBMS). Both the Java programming language, and the C# programming language versions are compact. It can store data directly in Java and .NET objects, eliminating the need for translation typical in relational and object-relational databases. With a compact core consisting of only five thousand lines of code, Perst demands minimal system resources.

== History ==
Perst was launched in 2003, in Russia. It was designed to achieve high-performance by tightly integrating the database with the programming language: Perst directly stores data in the language objects. In 2006 McObject LLC, based in the Seattle, Washington area, took over the development of Perst. It continues to offer free downloads and has added commercial license options.

Perst was first written in Java and ported to C#. Although originally designed for desktop- and server-based software, Perst has also found usage in providing database management for mobile applications running on devices such as smartphones.
