= AllegroGraph =

Graph database system

- Developer: Franz Inc.
- Stable release: 9.0 / May 2026; 4 months ago
- Written in: Java, Python, Common Lisp
- Operating system: server: Linux (64-bit); clients: Microsoft Windows (64-bit), macOS (Intel 64-bit, ARM 64-bit), Linux (Intel and ARM 64-bit)
- License: Proprietary commercial software
- Website: allegrograph.com

AllegroGraph is a closed source triplestore which is designed to store RDF triples, a standard format for Linked Data. It also operates as a document store designed for storing, retrieving and managing document-oriented information, in JSON-LD format. AllegroGraph is currently in use in commercial projects and a US Department of Defense project. It is also the storage component for the TwitLogic project that is bringing the Semantic Web to Twitter data.

== Implementation ==
AllegroGraph was developed to meet W3C standards for the Resource Description Framework, so it is properly considered an RDF Database. It is a reference implementation for the SPARQL protocol. SPARQL is a standard query language for linked data, serving the same purposes for RDF databases that SQL serves for relational databases.

Franz Inc. is the developer of AllegroGraph. It also develops Allegro Common Lisp, an implementation of Common Lisp, a dialect of Lisp (programming language). The functionality of AllegroGraph is made available through Java, Python, Common Lisp and other APIs.

The first version of AllegroGraph was made available at the end of 2004.

=== Languages ===
AllegroGraph has client interfaces for Java, Python, Ruby, Perl, C#, Clojure, and Common Lisp. The product is available for Windows, Linux, and Mac OS X platforms, supporting 32 or 64 bits.

For query languages, besides SPARQL, AllegroGraph also supports Prolog and JavaScript.
