= Multi-model database =

Database management system

In the field of database design, a multi-model database is a database management system designed to support multiple data models against a single, integrated backend. In contrast, most database management systems are organized around a single data model that determines how data can be organized, stored, and manipulated. Document, graph, relational, and key–value models are examples of data models that may be supported by a multi-model database.

== Background ==
The relational data model became popular after its publication by Edgar F. Codd in 1970. Due to increasing requirements for horizontal scalability and fault tolerance, NoSQL databases became prominent after 2009. NoSQL databases use a variety of data models, with document, graph, and key–value models being popular.

A multi-model database is a database that can store, index and query data in more than one model. For some time, databases have primarily supported only one model, such as: relational database, document-oriented database, graph database or triplestore. A database that combines many of these is multi-model. This should not be confused with multimodal database systems such as Pixeltable or ApertureDB, which focus on unified management of different media types (images, video, audio, text) rather than different data models.

For some time, it was all but forgotten (or considered irrelevant) that there were any other database models besides relational. The relational model and notion of third normal form were the default standard for all data storage. However, prior to the dominance of relational data modeling, from about 1980 to 2005, the hierarchical database model was commonly used. Since 2000 or 2010, many NoSQL models that are non-relational, including documents, triples, key–value stores and graphs are popular. Arguably, geospatial data, temporal data, and text data are also separate models, though indexed, queryable text data is generally termed a "search engine" rather than a database.

The first time the word "multi-model" has been associated to the databases was on May 30, 2012 in Cologne, Germany, during the Luca Garulli's key note "NoSQL Adoption – What’s the Next Step?". Luca Garulli envisioned the evolution of the 1st generation NoSQL products into new products with more features able to be used by multiple use cases.

The idea of multi-model databases can be traced back to Object–Relational Data Management Systems (ORDBMS) in the early 1990s and in a more broader scope even to federated and integrated DBMSs in the early 1980s. An ORDBMS system manages different types of data such as relational, object, text and spatial by plugging domain specific data types, functions and index implementations into the DBMS kernels. A multi-model database is most directly a response to the "polyglot persistence" approach of knitting together multiple database products, each handing a different model, to achieve a multi-model capability as described by Martin Fowler. This strategy has two major disadvantages: it leads to a significant increase in operational complexity, and there is no support for maintaining data consistency across the separate data stores, so multi-model databases have begun to fill in this gap.

Multi-model databases are intended to offer the data modeling advantages of polyglot persistence, without its disadvantages. Operational complexity, in particular, is reduced through the use of a single data store.

=== Converged database ===
A related concept is the converged database, which extends multi-model database capabilities by integrating multiple data types and processing functions within a single database engine. Rather than simply supporting multiple data models, a converged database is designed to manage different workloads through shared database architecture and infrastructure. Oracle AI Database is an example of a database platform developed around this approach.

== Benchmarking multi-model databases ==
As more and more platforms are proposed to deal with multi-model data, there are a few works on benchmarking multi-model databases. For instance, Pluciennik, Oliveira, and UniBench reviewed existing multi-model databases and made an evaluation effort towards comparing multi-model databases and other SQL and NoSQL databases respectively. They pointed out that the advantages of multi-model databases over single-model databases are as follows :

1. they are able to ingest a variety of data formats such as CSV (including Graph, Relational), JSON into storage without any additional efforts.
2. they can employ a unified query language such as AQL, Orient SQL, SQL/XML, SQL/JSON to retrieve correlated multi-model data, such as graph-JSON-key/value, XML-relational, and JSON-relational in a single platform.
3. they are able to support multi-model ACID transactions in the stand-alone mode.

== Architecture ==
The main difference between the available multi-model databases is related to their architectures. Multi-model databases can support different models either within the engine or via different layers on top of the engine. Some products may provide an engine which supports documents and graphs while others provide layers on top of a key-key store. With a layered architecture, each data model is provided via its own component.

== User-defined data models ==
In addition to offering multiple data models in a single data store, some databases allow developers to easily define custom data models. This capability is enabled by ACID transactions with high performance and scalability. In order for a custom data model to support concurrent updates, the database must be able to synchronize updates across multiple keys. ACID transactions, if they are sufficiently performant, allow such synchronization. JSON documents, graphs, and relational tables can all be implemented in a manner that inherits the horizontal scalability and fault-tolerance of the underlying data store.

== Theoretical Foundation for Multi-Model Databases ==
The traditional theory of relations is not enough to accurately describe multi-model database systems. Recent research is focused on developing a new theoretical foundation for these systems. Category theory can provide a unified, rigorous language for modeling, integrating, and transforming different data models. By representing multi-model data as sets and their relationships as functions or relations within the Set category, we can create a formal framework to describe, manipulate, and understand various data models and how they interact.

== See also ==
- ACID
- Big data
- NoSQL
- Comparison of structured storage software
- Database transaction
- Data analysis
- Distributed database
- Distributed SQL
- Distributed transaction
- Document-oriented database
- Graph database
- Relational model
