= Xeround =

Cloud database software

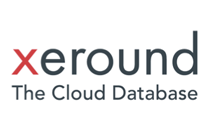

Xeround was a provider of cloud database software, launched in 2005, and was shut down in May 2013. The company was founded by Sharon Barkai and Gilad Zlotkin. Zlotkin, a former research fellow at MIT Sloan School of Management, founded five other startups including Radview (NASDAQ:RDVW). Israeli financial newspaper Globes ranked the company as one of Israel's most promising start-ups in 2006.

Xeround's product was initially used by telecom providers, including T-Mobile; in 2009 the company added a MySQL front end to its product, making it applicable to a mass market of 12 million MySQL applications. The product allows MySQL users to scale their database and achieve high availability on cloud platforms like Amazon EC2. The beta version of the service was reported to be used by 2000 organizations; General availability was announced in June 2011. According to CNET blogger Dave Rosenberg, Xeround's MySQL support makes it "well positioned to take a leadership position in the database market".

On May 1, 2013, Xeround announced to its paid customers that they were shutting down the cloud database service and all data must be migrated before being dropped on May 15, 2013.

== Product ==
Xeround provides a cloud database service for applications based on the open source edition of the MySQL database (MySQL is currently owned by Oracle). The product addresses two related problems: it is complex to run databases on the cloud, especially if high availability is needed; and databases in general are difficult to scale, as data throughput and volumes grow. A cloud database service solves both problems, by managing the database on the cloud and taking care of scalability and high availability, in a way that is transparent to the application. Instead of connecting to a local instance of MySQL, applications can connect to Xeround's cloud database, and are then free to scale as needed. Because Xeround is an in-memory distributed database, it is currently limited up to 50 Gigabytes of data. Xeround gives a no downtime SLA guarantee. The service offers pay-per-use pricing, calculated per Gigabyte per hour, with an additional charge for data transfer for large databases.

Xeround offers its service on several cloud platforms - as of September 2011, Xeround supported Amazon EC2, RackSpace, and Heroku, and is planning to support additional providers. As of March 2011, Xeround was the only commercially available product which supports more than one cloud provider, allowing users to move their databases freely between cloud platforms without being locked in.

While Xeround uses the open source version of MySQL, the cloud database software itself is not open source. Another distinction is that while Xeround offers MySQL as a front-end, on the back-end it is a NoSQL data storage system distributed on a large number of physical nodes - so it is not subject to the scalability limitations of regular MySQL databases.

On 1 May 2013 Xeround announced via an e-mail to customers that they would no longer be providing their service. The service is to end on 15 May 2013.

== Company timeline ==
- 2005 - Xeround is founded by Sharon Barkai and Gilad Zlotkin, raises $6.5 million in Series A funding, focuses initially on distributed database software for Telecom providers.
- 2006 - Xeround ranked as one of Israel's most promising start-ups by Israeli financial newspaper Globes.
- 2008 - Xeround raises an additional $16 million in Series B funding.
- 2009 - Xeround recruits Razi Sharir as CEO and repositions its product as a cloud database service with a MySQL front-end.
- 2010 - Xeround launches beta version of its database service.
- 2011 - Xeround announces General Availability of its cloud database service, and raises an additional $4 million in its final financing round.
- 2011 - Xeround Raises $9.3M From Benchmark And Others.
- 2013 - Xeround announced its shutdown.

== Competitors and alternatives ==
Xeround's primary competitors are database services offered by the large cloud vendors, Amazon Relational Database Service and Database.com by Salesforce. Other cloud database providers mentioned by industry sources are Microsoft Azure SQL Database, NimbusDB, ClearDB, ParAccel, as well as NoSQL key-value data stores such as Amazon SimpleDB, Google Cloud Datastore, Couchbase Server, and Cloudant.

Database users running their applications on the cloud also have the option of installing databases in a "do it yourself" manner instead of paying for a cloud database service. This involves purchasing a machine instance on a cloud computing platform like Amazon EC2, and manually installing a database.
