= Cloud analytics =

Cloud analytics is a marketing term for businesses to carry out analysis using cloud computing. It uses a range of analytical tools and techniques to help companies extract information from massive data and present it in a way that is easily categorised and readily available via a web browser.

Cloud analytics is term for a set of technological and analytical tools and techniques specifically designed to help clients extract information from massive data.

Cloud analytics is designed to make official statistical data readily categorized and available via the users web browser.

The global Cloud Analytics Market size is expected to grow from USD 35.7 billion in 2024 to USD 118.5 billion in 2029, at a CAGR of 27.1% during the forecast period, according to a new report by MarketsandMarkets™.

== Cloud analytics tools ==
AWS analytics products:

- Amazon Athena runs interactive queries directly against data in Amazon S3.
- Amazon EMR deploys open source, big data frameworks like Apache Hadoop, Spark, Presto, HBase, and Flink.
- Amazon Redshift fully manages petabyte-scale data warehouse to run complex queries on collections of structured data.

Google Cloud analytics products:

- BigQuery Google's fully-managed low cost analytics data warehouse.
- Composer fully manages workflow orchestration service to author, schedule, and monitor pipelines that span across clouds and on-premises data centers.
- Data Studio turns data into dashboards and reports that can be read, shared, and customized.
- Dataflow unifies programming models and manages services for executing a range of data processing patterns including streaming analytics, ETL, and batch computation.
- Datalab is an interactive notebook (based on Jupyter) to explore, collaborate, analyze and visualize data.
- Dataprep is a data service for visually exploring, cleaning, and preparing structured and unstructured data for analysis.
- Dataproc manages Spark and Hadoop service, to process big datasets using the open tools in the Apache big data ecosystem.
- Pub/Sub is a serverless, large-scale, real-time messaging service that allows you to send and receive messages between independent applications.

Related Azure services and Microsoft products:

- HDInsight provisions cloud Hadoop, Spark, R Server, HBase, and Storm clusters.
- Data Lake Analytics distributes analytics service that makes big data easy.
- Machine Learning Studio easily builds, deploys, and manages predictive analytics solutions.
