= MachEye =

Former American software company

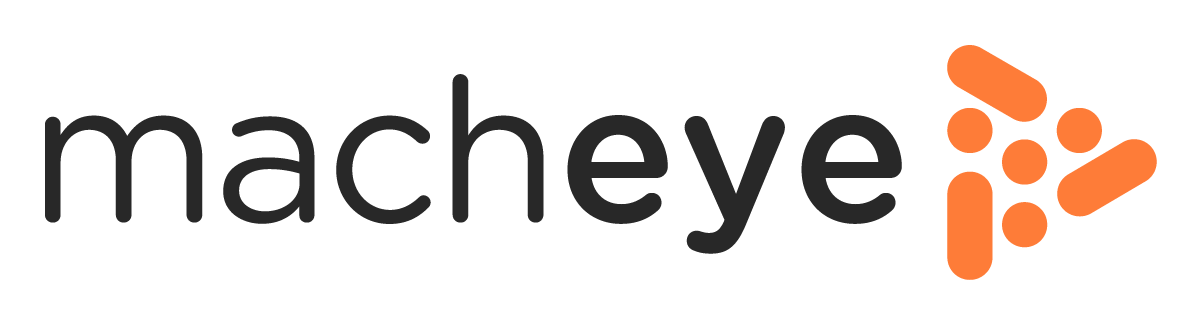
- Type: Privately held company
- Industry: Software
- Founded: 2018
- Founder: Ramesh Panuganty
- Headquarters: San Jose, CA, US
- Services: Business analytics software
- Website: https://www.macheye.com

MachEye was an American company that developed software for business analytics. The company was based in San Jose, California. Its software presented data insights as interactive audio-visuals.

== History ==
MachEye was founded in 2018 by Ramesh Panuganty. Panuganty previously founded Drastin, the conversational analytics platform that was later acquired by Splunk to improve search-based analytics and intuitiveness in Splunk.

In October 2020, MachEye raised $4.6 million in seed funding, backed by Canaan Partners and West Wave Capital.

In May 2024, the company was acquired by Verint.

== Services ==
MachEye's platform uses technologies such as artificial intelligence, machine learning, natural language processing, natural language generation, and text-to-speech. MachEye's AI technology generates audio-visual reports based on users' data. MachEye can also generate reports based on an analysis of users' search history on its platform.

MachEye's platform can connect to cloud data sources such as Amazon Redshift, Microsoft's Synapse, Google's BigQuery, and Snowflake Computing's CDP.
