= Stackdriver =

Former cloud computing service offered by Google

Google Stackdriver
- Website type: Systems management
- Area served: Worldwise
- Owner: Google
- Website: cloud.google.com/stackdriver
- Commercial: Yes (Terms of Service)
- Registration: Required
- Launched: May 1, 2014; 12 years ago
- Current status: Rebranded

Google Stackdriver was a cloud computing systems management service offered by Google. It provided performance and diagnostics data, including monitoring, logging, tracing, error reporting, and alerting, to public cloud users. Stackdriver supported both Google Cloud and AWS environments.

== History ==
Stackdriver was founded in 2012 by Dan Belcher and Izzy Azeri and secured US$5 million in funding from Bain Capital Ventures.

A beta version of the product became publicly available on April 30, 2013. The company had 15 employees and aimed to provide consistent monitoring across multiple layers of cloud infrastructure through its software-as-a-service platform.

In May 2014, Stackdriver was acquired by Google. In October 2016, Google launched an expanded version of the product as Google Stackdriver, adding support for log analysis, hybrid cloud environments, and deeper integration with Google Cloud.

In February 2020, Google retired the Stackdriver brand and announced a transition to suite of products within Google Cloud Console. In August 2020, Google referred to the product family as the Google Cloud Operations Suite.

By 2025, Google had begun using the name Google Cloud Observability.
