= Apache Beam =

Unified programming model for data processing pipelines

- Original author: Google
- Developer: Apache Software Foundation
- Release: June 15, 2016; 10 years ago
- Stable release: 2.71.0 (January 22, 2026; 9 months ago) [±]
- Written in: Java, Python, Go
- Operating system: Cross-platform
- License: Apache License 2.0
- Website: beam.apache.org
- Repository: Beam Repository

Apache Beam is an open source unified programming model to define and execute data processing pipelines, including ETL, batch and stream (continuous) processing. Beam Pipelines are defined using one of the provided SDKs and executed in one of the Beam's supported runners (distributed processing back-ends) including Apache Flink, Apache Samza, Apache Spark, and Google Cloud Dataflow.

== History ==
Apache Beam is one implementation of the Dataflow model paper. The Dataflow model is based on previous work on distributed processing abstractions at Google, in particular on FlumeJava and Millwheel.

Google released an open SDK implementation of the Dataflow model in 2014 and an environment to execute Dataflows locally (non-distributed) as well as in the Google Cloud Platform service.

=== Timeline ===
Apache Beam makes minor releases every 6 weeks.

Version	Release date
2.78.0	2026-11-18
2.77.0	2026-10-07
2.76.0	2026-08-31
2.75.0	2026-07-08
2.74.0	2026-06-02
2.73.0	2026-04-29
2.72.0	2026-03-30
2.71.0	2026-01-22
2.70.0	2025-12-16
2.69.0	2025-10-28
2.68.0	2025-09-22
2.67.0	2025-08-12
2.66.0	2025-07-01
2.65.0	2025-05-12
2.64.0	2025-03-31
2.63.0	2025-02-18
2.62.0	2025-01-21
2.61.0	2024-11-25
2.60.0	2024-10-17
2.59.0	2024-09-11
2.58.1	2024-08-15
2.58.0	2024-08-06
2.57.0	2024-06-26
Legend: Unsupported Supported Latest version

Older versions
Version	Release date
2.56.0	2024-05-01
2.55.0	2024-03-25
2.54.0	2024-02-14
2.53.0	2024-01-04
2.52.0	2023-11-17
2.51.0	2023-10-11
2.50.0	2023-08-30
2.49.0	2023-07-17
2.48.0	2023-05-31
2.47.0	2023-05-10
2.46.0	2023-03-10
2.45.0	2023-02-15
2.44.0	2023-01-12
2.43.0	2022-11-17
2.42.0	2022-10-17
2.41.0	2022-08-23
2.40.0	2022-06-27
2.39.0	2022-05-25
2.38.0	2022-04-20
2.37.0	2022-03-04
2.36.0	2022-02-07
2.35.0	2021-12-29
2.34.0	2021-11-11
2.33.0	2021-10-07
2.32.0	2021-08-25
2.31.0	2021-07-08
2.30.0	2021-06-09
2.29.0	2021-04-27
2.28.0	2021-02-22
2.27.0	2021-01-08
2.26.0	2020-12-11
2.25.0	2020-10-23
2.24.0	2020-09-18
2.23.0	2020-07-29
2.22.0	2020-06-08
2.21.0	2020-05-27
2.20.0	2020-04-15
2.19.0	2020-02-04
2.18.0	2020-01-23
2.17.0	2020-01-06
2.16.0	2019-10-07
2.15.0	2019-08-22
2.14.0	2019-08-01
2.13.0	2019-05-22
2.12.0	2019-04-25
2.11.0	2019-02-26
2.10.0	2019-02-01
2.9.0	2018-12-13
2.8.0	2018-10-29
2.7.0 (LTS)	2018-10-03
2.6.0	2018-08-08
2.5.0	2018-06-26
2.4.0	2018-03-20
2.3.0	2018-01-30
2.2.0	2017-12-02
2.1.0	2017-08-23
2.0.0	2017-05-17
0.6.0	2017-03-11
0.5.0	2017-02-02
0.4.0	2016-12-29
0.3.0	2016-10-31
0.2.0	2016-08-08
0.1.0	2016-06-15
Legend: Unsupported Supported Latest version

== See also ==
- List of Apache Software Foundation projects
