= Amazon Redshift =

Cloud-based data warehouse service

- Developer(s): Amazon.com
- Initial release: October 2012; 12 years ago
- Operating system: Cross-platform
- Available in: English
- Type: wave
- License: Proprietary
- Website: aws.amazon.com/redshift/

Amazon Redshift is a data warehouse product which forms part of the larger cloud-computing platform Amazon Web Services. It is built on top of technology from the massive parallel processing (MPP) data warehouse company ParAccel (later acquired by Actian), to handle large scale data sets and database migrations. Redshift differs from Amazon's other hosted database offering, Amazon RDS, in its ability to handle analytic workloads on big data data sets stored by a column-oriented DBMS principle. Redshift allows up to 16 petabytes of data on a cluster. Redshift uses parallel processing and compression to decrease command execution time.

Amazon Redshift is based on an older version of PostgreSQL 8.0.2, and Redshift has made changes to that version. An initial preview beta was released in November 2012 and a full release was made available on February 15, 2013.

Amazon has listed a number of business intelligence software proprietors as partners and tested tools in their "APN Partner" program, including Actian, Actuate Corporation, Alteryx, Dundas Data Visualization, IBM Cognos, InetSoft, Infor, Logi Analytics, Looker, MicroStrategy, Pentaho, Qlik, SiSense, Tableau Software, and Yellowfin. Partner companies providing data integration tools include Informatica and SnapLogic. System integration and consulting partners include Accenture, Deloitte, Capgemini and DXC Technology.

The "Red" in Redshift's name alludes to Oracle, a competing computer technology company sometimes informally referred to as "Big Red" due to its red corporate color. Hence, customers choosing to move their databases from Oracle to Redshift would be "shifting" from "Red".

== See also ==
- Amazon Aurora
- Amazon DynamoDB
- Amazon Relational Database Service
