= Google Cloud Dataflow =

Cloud-based data processing pipeline service

Google Cloud Dataflow is a fully managed service for executing Apache Beam pipelines within the Google Cloud Platform ecosystem. Dataflow provides a fully managed service for executing Apache Beam pipelines, offering features like autoscaling, dynamic work rebalancing, and a managed execution environment.

Dataflow is suitable for large-scale, continuous data processing jobs, and is one of the major components of Google's big data architecture on the Google Cloud Platform.

At its core, Dataflow's architecture is designed to abstract away infrastructure management, allowing developers to focus purely on the logic of their data processing tasks. When a pipeline written using the Apache Beam SDK is submitted, Dataflow translates this high-level definition into an optimized job graph. The service then provisions and manages a fleet of Google Compute Engine workers to execute this graph in a highly parallelized and fault-tolerant manner. This serverless approach, combined with intelligent autoscaling of both the number of workers (horizontal) and the resources per worker (vertical), ensures that jobs have the precise amount of computational power needed at any given time, optimizing both performance and cost.

The service's deep integration with the Google Cloud ecosystem considers a powerful tool for a variety of use cases beyond simple data movement. For real-time analytics, Dataflow is able to ingest unbounded streams of data from Cloud Pub/Sub, perform complex transformations, and load results into BigQuery for immediate querying. In machine learning workflows, it is commonly used to preprocess and transform massive datasets stored in Cloud Storage, preparing them for training models in Vertex AI. Because of this versatility, it is used as the central processing engine for modern ETL (Extract, Transform, Load) operations, streaming analytics, and large-scale data preparation within the cloud.

== History ==
Google Cloud Dataflow was announced in June, 2014 and released to the general public as an open beta in April, 2015. In January, 2016 Google donated the underlying SDK, the implementation of a local runner, and a set of IOs (data connectors) to access Google Cloud Platform data services to the Apache Software Foundation. The donated code formed the original basis for Apache Beam.

In August 2022, there was an incident where user timers were broken for certain Dataflow streaming pipelines in multiple regions, which was later resolved. Throughout 2023 and 2024, there have been various other updates and incidents affecting Google Cloud Dataflow, as documented in the release notes and service health history.

The donation of the Dataflow SDK to the Apache Software Foundation was a pivotal moment, establishing Apache Beam as a unified, open-source programming model for defining both batch and streaming data pipelines. This strategic move decoupled the pipeline definition from the execution engine. As a result, developers could write portable data processing logic that was not locked into Google's ecosystem. A Beam pipeline can be executed on various runners, including Apache Flink, Apache Spark, and, of course, the highly optimized Google Cloud Dataflow service, providing flexibility and future-proofing data processing investments.

== Features ==
Google Cloud Dataflow supports both batch and streaming data processing pipelines. It automatically handles resource provisioning, data sharding, and scaling according to workload, reducing manual configuration needed for large-scale data operations.

== Use cases ==
Dataflow is used for ETL (Extract, Transform, Load) data pipelines, real-time analytics, and event stream processing for companies in industries such as finance, advertising, and IoT.
