= Cloudant =

IBM software product

IBM Cloudant
- Developers: Original development by Cloudant, now developed by IBM, based on Apache CouchDB
- Type: NoSQL, DBaaS
- License: Monthly subscription or perpetual software license agreement, Proprietary
- Website: cloudant.com

Cloudant is an IBM software product, which is primarily delivered as a cloud-based service. Cloudant is a non-relational, distributed database service of the same name. Cloudant is based on the Apache-backed CouchDB project and the open source BigCouch project.

Cloudant's service provides integrated data management, search, and analytics engine designed for web applications. Cloudant scales databases on the CouchDB framework and provides hosting, administrative tools, analytics and commercial support for CouchDB and BigCouch. Cloudant's distributed CouchDB service is used the same way as standalone CouchDB, with the added advantage of data being redundantly distributed over multiple machines.

Cloudant was acquired by IBM from the start-up company of the same name. The acquisition was announced on February 24, 2014, The acquisition was completed on March 4 of that year.

By March 31, 2018, Cloudant Shared Plan will be retired and migrated to IBM Cloud.

== History ==
Cloudant was founded by Alan Hoffman, Adam Kocoloski, and Michael Miller. The three met in the physics department at MIT where they worked with large data sets from experiments such as the Large Hadron Collider and the Relativistic Heavy Ion Collider. In early 2008 their ideas for fixing the "big data problem" caught the attention of Silicon Valley–based Y Combinator, which resulted in $20,000 seed funding. The company also received an early seed round of $1 million from Avalon Ventures in August 2010. Cloudant was designed for cloud computing, automatically distributing data across multiple servers in addition to scaling the database to accommodate web applications.

In August 2010, Cloudant released free BigCouch under an Apache License(2.0). Cloudant offered services including support, consulting services and training. Cloudant delivered their first product in the third quarter of 2010. Cloudant has over 2500 customers for its hosted service as of January 2011.

In November 2010, Cloudant was recognized as one of ‘10 Cool Open-Source Startups’ by CRN. Cloudant was regularly recognized in the local Boston startup community, named as one of the ‘Top 5 Database Startups’ and ‘Top Ten Cloud Computing Startups’ in Boston’s popular technology column by Joe Kinsella, ‘High Tech in the Hub.’. On February 24, 2014, IBM announced an agreement to acquire Cloudant. The acquisition closed in March, after which Cloudant joined IBM's Information and Analytics Group.

In September, 2016, IBM Cloudant completed the donation of the BigCouch project to The Apache Software Foundation, resulting in the release of Apache CouchDB 2.0. CouchDB 2.0 incorporates many of the improvements made by Cloudant and BigCouch to the original CouchDB project, including clustering capabilities, a declarative query language and performance enhancements.

== Differences with CouchDB ==
Cloudant's hosted database extends CouchDB in several ways:

- Chained MapReduce Views
- Java Language View Server allows usage of Java for CouchDB map reduce analytics.
- Application programming interface keys for programmatic access to CouchDB database.

== See also ==
- Apache Software Foundation
- BigCouch
- Big data
- CouchDB
- Cloud computing
- Cloud infrastructure
- Database-centric architecture
- Data structure
- NoSQL
- Real time database
