= Clusterpoint =

European software technology company

Clusterpoint Ltd.
- Company type: Private
- Industry: enterprise software database software cloud computing
- Founded: August 21, 2006
- Founder: Gints Ernestsons; Jurgis Orups; Oskars Viksna
- Headquarters: London, United Kingdom
- Products: Clusterpoint DBMS; Clusterpoint DBaaS; NTSS; GOL
- Website: www.clusterpoint.com

Clusterpoint Database
- Developer: Clusterpoint Ltd.
- Initial release: 2006
- Stable release: 4.0 / October 8, 2015
- Available in: English
- Type: Distributed database
- Website: www.clusterpoint.com

Clusterpoint is a European software technology company founded in 2006 and headquartered in London, United Kingdom. The company develops and supports the Clusterpoint database management system platform.

The company was founded by software engineers Gints Ernestsons, Jurgis Orups, and Oskars Viksna, and is venture capital backed. For most of its history Clusterpoint has been servicing business customers as an enterprise software vendor.

== Clusterpoint database ==
Clusterpoint is a schema-free document database.

Examples are where SQL RDBMS data is used in combination with an enterprise search engine to address performance and scalability needs of web and mobile applications, or where big data and analytics tools such as Hadoop might be needed due to sheer volume of data or large computing workloads.

=== General features ===
- Data is managed in open, cross-platform, industry-standard XML or JSON format using open API, for instance, Python API or JavaScript Node.js API
- Data structure agnostic and type-rich database, handles variable data structure XML or JSON documents in a single database. Supports unstructured textual data, dates, numbers, meta-data (all XML and JSON types)
- Cross-platform support: binaries are available for Linux, FreeBSD, Mac OS X and Windows. Clusterpoint database software can be compiled on other operating systems.
- Multi-master cluster software architecture: any cluster node can serve as a master and run the management application
- Horizontal database scalability: scales out from a single server to few thousands of servers networked into a cluster infrastructure

== Clusterpoint products ==
- Clusterpoint DBMS: Clustered NoSQL database, which uses the approach of multiple server system to spread load and increase performance. Clusterpoint database facilitates high parallelism of computing and distribution of data.
- GOL: Big Data SIEM Analytics tool from Clusterpark – Log, Events and Security Records Search and Analytics.
- DigiBrowser: Quick SQL denormalization into NoSQL database – imports multi-table SQL database into one Clusterpoint database using automagic denormalization.
- NTSS: Network Traffic Surveillance System for Lawful Intercept – High-speed capture, store, search and analysis of all Internet traffic for the corporate network.
