= SnapLogic =

Internet software company

- Headquarters: San Mateo, California, U.S.
- Area served: Global
- Products: Data integration, Application integration, iPaaS, AgentCreator, API management
- Services: Cloud computing, Data integration, API management, Artificial intelligence
- Number of employees: 376 (January 2024)
- Website: www.snaplogic.com

SnapLogic is a commercial software company that provides an integration platform as a service (iPaaS) for connecting cloud computing data sources, SaaS applications, on-premises business software and APIs. Founded in 2006 by Gaurav Dhillon, former CEO and co-founder of Informatica, the company is headquartered in San Mateo, California. SnapLogic is now led by Brad Stewart and is venture-backed by firms including Andreessen Horowitz, Ignition Partners, Microsoft, Silver Lake Waterman, Sixth Street and Capital One Ventures.

== Products and services ==
SnapLogic provides a platform for data and application integration (iPaaS), API management and process automation. Its agentic (AI agent-based) capabilities let users create and orchestrate agents that automate data integration, workflow orchestration and decision-making across cloud and on-premises environments. The platform also includes visual workflow tools, pre-built connectors, hybrid and multi-cloud support, API creation tools and data-pipeline automation.

Integrations are implemented as modular, reusable components called Snaps. The platform includes over 1,000 Snaps covering databases, cloud services, SaaS applications and enterprise systems, which can be combined in a visual pipeline designer without requiring custom code.

The platform includes a legacy workload migration capability called the SnapLogic Intelligent Modernizer (SLIM), which automates the assessment, conversion, testing, and documentation of data integration pipelines from legacy tools to support their migration to the SnapLogic platform.

== History ==
In December 2015, SnapLogic raised US$37.5 million in Series E funding led by Microsoft and Silver Lake Waterman, with participation from Andreessen Horowitz, Ignition Partners and Triangle Peak Partners. In May 2017, SnapLogic introduced its AI-powered Iris Integration Assistant, a machine-learning recommendation engine for building data pipelines. In December 2021, the company raised US$165 million in a round led by Sixth Street Growth, valuing SnapLogic at about US$1 billion.

In August 2023, SnapLogic launched SnapGPT, a generative-AI copilot for data and application integration. In October of that same year, it introduced AgentCreator, a low-code generative-AI tool for building and deploying AI agents.

== Customers ==
According to a press release, SnapLogic’s enterprise customers include Adobe, Emirates, Schneider Electric, Siemens and Workday, among others.

== See also ==
- Data integration
- Extract, transform, and load (ETL)
