= Outschool =

American online marketplace

Outschool, Inc.
- Industry: Online education
- Founded: 2015
- Founder: Amir Nathoo; Mikhail Seregine; Nick Grandy
- Headquarters: San Francisco, California
- Revenue: $100,000,000 (2020)
- Number of employees: 110 (2020)
- Website: outschool.com

Outschool, Inc. is an American online education platform for children that provides virtual classes. It is headquartered in San Francisco, California.

== History ==
Outschool was co-founded in 2015 by Amir Nathoo, alongside former Google employee Mikhail Seregine and Nick Grandy, an engineer working for Airbnb.

Using seed money from startup accelerator Y Combinator, Nathoo and company created the platform's website in 2016; the first class was released shortly after in 2017.

In September 2020, Outschool raised $45 million in a round of Series B funding led by Lightspeed. This was followed in April 2021 by $75 million of Series C funding, causing the company to become a unicorn valued at $1.3 billion. In October 2021, it raised $110M in Series D funding led by Tiger Global Management, which brought its valuation to $3 billion.
