= Direct read after write =

Error-detection technique

Direct read after write is a procedure that compares data recorded onto a medium against the source. A typical example would be CD burning software which reads a CD-ROM once it has been burned onto, effectively ensuring that data written is the same as the data it was copied from.
