= Amazon Web Services =

On-demand cloud computing provider

Amazon Web Services, Inc.
- Type: Subsidiary
- Industry: Web services, cloud computing
- Founded: July 2002; 24 years ago (Note: Launched in July 2002, the Amazon Web Services platform exposes technology and product data from Amazon and its affiliates, enabling developers to build innovative and entrepreneurial applications on their own.) (Web services); March 2006; 20 years ago (Note: In 2006, Amazon Web Services (AWS) began offering IT infrastructure services to businesses in the form of web services — now commonly known as cloud computing.) (Cloud computing)
- Key people: Matt Garman (CEO); C. J. Moses (CISO)
- Revenue: ▲US$128.7 billion (2025)
- Operating income: ▲US$45.6 billion (2025)
- Parent: Amazon
- Subsidiaries: Annapurna Labs; AWS Elemental; NICE Software; AWS Wickr; DuckLabs
- ASN: 16509
- Website: aws.amazon.com

Amazon Web Services, Inc. (AWS) is a subsidiary of Amazon that provides on-demand cloud computing platforms and APIs to individuals, companies, and governments, on a metered, pay-as-you-go basis.

Clients often use this in combination with autoscaling (a process that allows a client to use more computing in times of high application usage, and then scale down to reduce costs when there is less traffic). These cloud computing web services provide various services related to networking, compute, storage, middleware, IoT and other processing capacity, as well as software tools via AWS server farms. This frees clients from managing, scaling, and patching hardware and operating systems.

One of the foundational services is Amazon Elastic Compute Cloud (EC2), which allows users to have at their disposal a virtual cluster of computers, with extremely high availability, which can be interacted with over the Internet via REST APIs, a CLI or the AWS console. AWS's virtual computers emulate most of the attributes of a real computer, including hardware central processing units (CPUs) and graphics processing units (GPUs) for processing; local/RAM memory; hard-disk (HDD)/SSD storage; a choice of operating systems; networking; and pre-loaded application software such as web servers, databases, and customer relationship management (CRM).

AWS services are delivered to customers via a network of AWS server farms located throughout the world. Fees are based on a combination of usage (known as a "Pay-as-you-go" model), hardware, operating system, software, and networking features chosen by the subscriber requiring various degrees of availability, redundancy, security, and service options. Subscribers can pay for a single virtual AWS computer, a dedicated physical computer, or clusters of either. Amazon provides select portions of security for subscribers (e.g. physical security of the data centers) while other aspects of security are the responsibility of the subscriber (e.g. account management, vulnerability scanning, patching). AWS operates from many global geographical regions, including nine in North America.

Amazon markets AWS to subscribers as a way of obtaining large-scale computing capacity more quickly and cheaply than building an actual physical server farm. All services are billed based on usage, but each service measures usage in varying ways. As of 2023 Q1, AWS has 31% market share for cloud infrastructure while the next two competitors Microsoft Azure and Google Cloud have 25%, and 11% respectively, according to Synergy Research Group. AWS was the first cloud provider to build infrastructure specifically for U.S. government with respect to security and compliance requirements (2011; launched AWS GovCloud), accredited to support classified workloads (2014; launched AWS Top Secret), and achieve accreditation across all U.S. government data classifications (2017; launched AWS Secret).

== Services ==
As of 2025 AWS comprises over 200 products and services including computing, storage, networking, database, analytics, application services, deployment, management, machine learning, mobile, developer tools, RobOps and tools for the Internet of Things. The most popular include Amazon Elastic Compute Cloud (EC2), Amazon Simple Storage Service (Amazon S3), Amazon Connect, and AWS Lambda (a serverless function that can perform arbitrary code written in any language that can be configured to be triggered by hundreds of events, including HTTP calls).

Services expose functionality through APIs for clients to use in their applications. These APIs are accessed over HTTP, using the REST architectural style and SOAP protocol for older APIs and exclusively JSON for newer ones. Clients can interact with these APIs in various ways, including from the AWS console (a website), by using SDKs written in various languages (such as Python, Java, and JavaScript), or by making direct REST calls.

== History ==
=== Founding (2000–2005) ===
Early AWS "building blocks" logo

The genesis of AWS came in the early 2000s. After building Merchant.com, Amazon's e-commerce-as-a-service platform that offers third-party retailers a way to build their own web-stores, Amazon pursued service-oriented architecture as a means to scale its engineering operations, led by then CTO Allan Vermeulen.

Around the same time frame, Amazon was frustrated with the speed of its software engineering, and sought to implement various recommendations put forth by Matt Round, an engineering leader at the time, including maximization of autonomy for engineering teams, adoption of REST, standardization of infrastructure, removal of gate-keeping decision-makers (bureaucracy), and continuous deployment. He also called for increasing the percentage of the time engineers spent building the software rather than doing other tasks. Amazon created "a shared IT platform" so its engineering organizations, which were spending 70% of their time on "undifferentiated heavy-lifting" such as IT and infrastructure problems, could focus on customer-facing innovation instead. Besides, in dealing with unusual peak traffic patterns, especially during the holiday season, by migrating services to commodity Linux hardware and relying on open source software, Amazon's Infrastructure team, led by Tom Killalea, Amazon's first CISO, had already run its data centers and associated services in a "fast, reliable, cheap" way.

In July 2002 Amazon.com Web Services, managed by Colin Bryar, launched its first web services, opening up the Amazon.com platform to all developers. Over one hundred applications were built on top of it by 2004. This unexpected developer interest took Amazon by surprise and convinced them that developers were "hungry for more".

By the summer of 2003, Andy Jassy had taken over Bryar's portfolio at Rick Dalzell's behest, after Vermeulen, who was Bezos' first pick, declined the offer. Jassy subsequently mapped out the vision for an "Internet OS" made up of foundational infrastructure primitives that alleviated key impediments to shipping software applications faster. By fall 2003, databases, storage, and compute were identified as the first set of infrastructure pieces that Amazon should launch.

Jeff Barr, an early AWS employee, credits himself, Vermeulen, Jassy, Bezos, and a few others for coming up with the idea that would evolve into EC2, S3, and RDS; Jassy recalls the idea was the result of brainstorming for about a week with "ten of the best technology minds and ten of the best product management minds" on about ten different Internet applications and the most primitive building blocks required to build them. Werner Vogels cites Amazon's desire to make the process of "invent, launch, reinvent, relaunch, start over, rinse, repeat" as fast as it could was leading them to break down organizational structures with "two-pizza teams" (Note: A team should not be any bigger than could be fed with two pizzas.) and application structures with distributed systems; (Note: Larger software applications broken down in to smaller services.) and that these changes ultimately paved way for the formation of AWS and its mission "to expose all of the atomic-level pieces of the Amazon.com platform". According to Brewster Kahle, co-founder of Alexa Internet, which was acquired by Amazon in 1999, his start-up's compute infrastructure helped Amazon solve its big data problems and later informed the innovations that underpinned AWS.

Jassy assembled a founding team of 57 employees from a mix of engineering and business backgrounds to kick-start these initiatives, with a majority of the hires coming from outside the company. They included Jeff Lawson, the Twilio CEO; Adam Selipsky, the Tableau CEO; and Mikhail Seregine, a co-founder at Outschool.

In late 2003, the concept for compute, (Note: code-named Amazon Execution Service in the pre-launch phase.) which would later launch as EC2, was reformulated when Chris Pinkham and Benjamin Black presented a paper internally describing a vision for Amazon's retail computing infrastructure that was completely standardized, completely automated, and would rely extensively on web services for services such as storage and would draw on internal work already underway. Near the end of their paper, they mentioned the possibility of selling access to virtual servers as a service, proposing the company could generate revenue from the new infrastructure investment. Thereafter Pinkham, Willem van Biljon, and lead developer Christopher Brown developed the Amazon EC2 service, with a team in Cape Town, South Africa.

In October 2004, Amazon released Alexa Web Information Service (AWIS) as beta. In November 2004, AWS launched its first infrastructure service, as beta: Simple Queue Service (SQS)., and officially launched in July 2006.

=== S3, EC2, and other first-generation services (2006–2010) ===
Amazon Elastic Block Store

On March 14, 2006, AWS launched Amazon S3 cloud storage, and that was the first AWS' IaaS that was generally available, followed by EC2 in August 2006. Pi Corporation, a startup Paul Maritz co-founded, was the first beta-user of EC2 outside of Amazon, while Microsoft was among EC2's first enterprise customers. Later that year SmugMug, one of the early AWS adopters, attributed savings of around US$400,000 in storage costs to S3. According to Vogels, S3 was built with 8 microservices when it launched in 2006 and had over 300 microservices by 2022.

In September 2007, AWS announced its annual Start-up Challenge, a contest with prizes worth $100,000 for entrepreneurs and software developers in the US using AWS services such as S3 and EC2 to build their businesses. The first edition saw participation from Justin.tv, which Amazon later acquired in 2014. Ooyala, an online media company, was the eventual winner.

AWS offers, as of June 16, 2022, two block-storage options: the EC2 Instance Store and the Elastic Block Store (EBS). Some Amazon EBS features that help with data management, backups, and performance tuning include:

- EBS volume tagging to allow the user to find and filter EBS resources on the Amazon Console and CLI.
- Software-level RAID arrays to enable creation of groups of EBS volumes with high performance network throughput between them, using the standard RAID protocol.

Additional AWS services from this period include SimpleDB, Mechanical Turk, Elastic Beanstalk, Relational Database Service, DynamoDB, CloudWatch, Simple Workflow, CloudFront, and Availability Zones.

=== Growth (2010–2015) ===
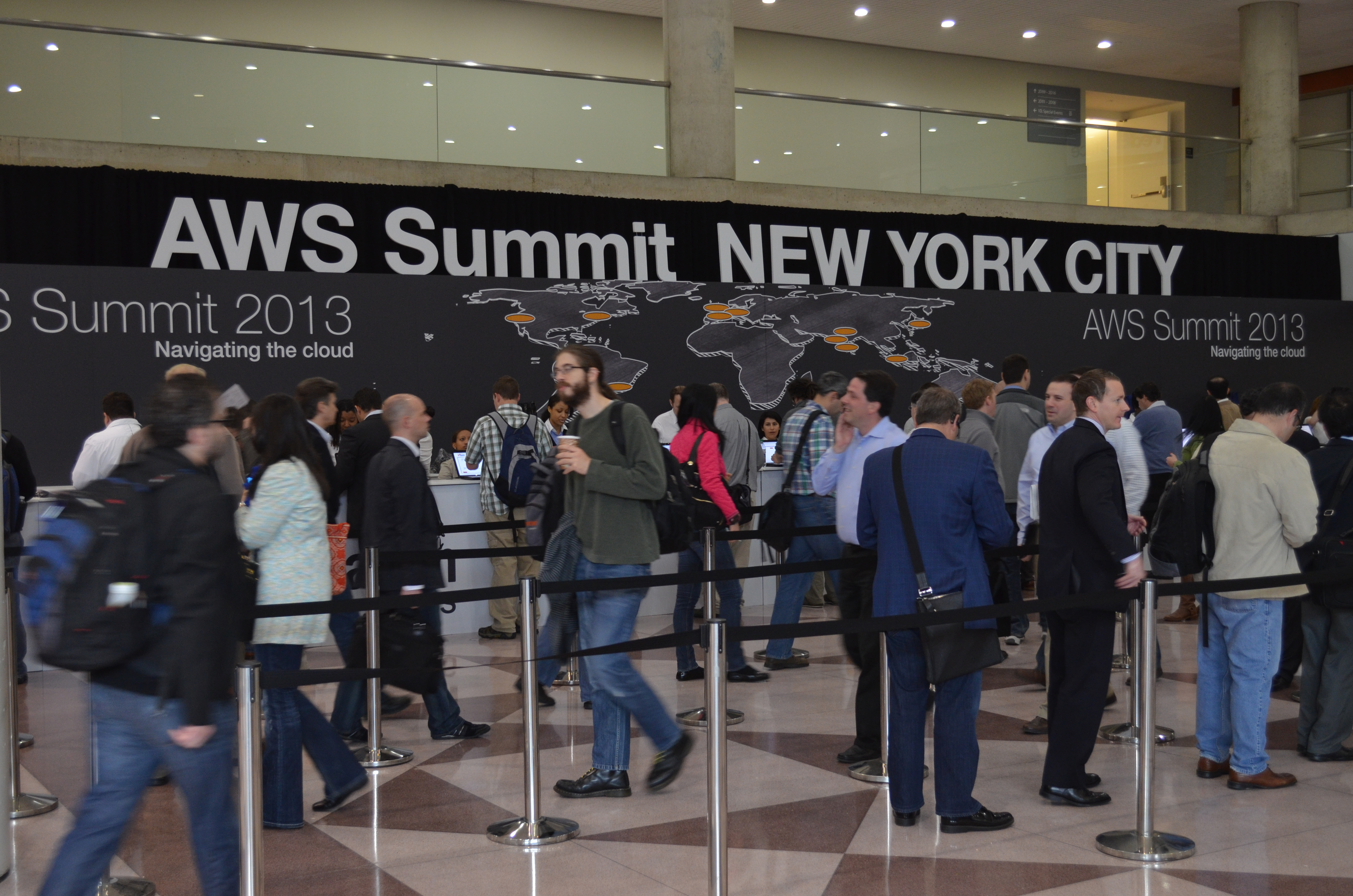
AWS Summit 2013 event in NYC

In November 2010, it was reported that all of Amazon.com's retail sites had migrated to AWS. Prior to 2012, AWS was considered a part of Amazon.com and so its revenue was not delineated in Amazon financial statements. In that year industry watchers for the first time estimated AWS revenue to be over $1.5 billion.

On November 27, 2012, AWS hosted its first major annual conference, re:Invent with a focus on AWS's partners and ecosystem, with over 150 sessions. The three-day event was held in Las Vegas because of its relatively cheaper connectivity with locations across the United States and the rest of the world. Andy Jassy and Werner Vogels presented keynotes, with Jeff Bezos joining Vogels for a fireside chat. AWS opened early registrations at US$1,099 per head for their customers from over 190 countries. On stage with Andy Jassy at the event which saw around 6000 attendees, Reed Hastings, CEO at Netflix, announced plans to migrate 100% of Netflix's infrastructure to AWS.

To support industry-wide training and skills standardization, AWS began offering a certification program for computer engineers, on April 30, 2013, to highlight expertise in cloud computing. Later that year, in October, AWS launched Activate, a program for start-ups worldwide to leverage AWS credits, third-party integrations, and free access to AWS experts to help build their business.

In 2014, AWS launched its partner network, AWS Partner Network (APN), which is focused on helping AWS-based companies grow and scale the success of their business with close collaboration and best practices.

In October 2014, Amazon Aurora was launched.

In January 2015, Amazon Web Services acquired Annapurna Labs, an Israel-based microelectronics company for a reported US$350–370M.

In April 2015, Amazon.com reported AWS was profitable, with sales of $1.57 billion in the first quarter of the year and $265 million of operating income. Founder Jeff Bezos described it as a fast-growing $5 billion business; analysts described it as "surprisingly more profitable than forecast". In October, Amazon.com said in its Q3 earnings report that AWS's operating income was $521 million, with operating margins at 25 percent. AWS's 2015 Q3 revenue was $2.1 billion, a 78% increase from 2014's Q3 revenue of $1.17 billion. 2015 Q4 revenue for the AWS segment increased 69.5% y/y to $2.4 billion with a 28.5% operating margin, giving AWS a $9.6 billion run rate. In 2015, Gartner estimated that AWS customers are deploying 10x more infrastructure on AWS than the combined adoption of the next 14 providers.

=== Since 2016 ===
In 2016 Q1, revenue was $2.57 billion with net income of $604 million, a 64% increase over 2015 Q1 that resulted in AWS being more profitable than Amazon's North American retail business for the first time. Jassy was thereafter promoted to CEO of the division. Around the same time, Amazon experienced a 42% rise in stock value as a result of increased earnings, of which AWS contributed 56% to corporate profits.

AWS had $17.46 billion in annual revenue in 2017. By the end of 2020, the number had grown to $46 billion. Reflecting the success of AWS, Jassy's annual compensation in 2017 hit nearly $36 million.

In January 2018, Amazon launched a unified autoscaling service on AWS. This new service unifies and builds on AWS existing, service-specific, scaling features like EC2 Auto Scaling groups, that was launched in August 2006.

In November 2018, AWS announced customized ARM cores for use in its servers. Also in November 2018, AWS announced AWS Ground Stations to communicate with customers' satellites.

In 2019, AWS reported 37% yearly growth and accounted for 12% of Amazon's revenue (up from 11% in 2018).

In April 2021, AWS reported 32% yearly growth and accounted for 32% of $41.8 billion cloud market in Q1 2021.

In January 2022, AWS joined the MACH Alliance, a non-profit enterprise technology advocacy group.

In June 2022, it was reported that in 2019 Capital One had not secured their AWS resources properly, and was subject to a data breach by a former AWS employee. The employee was convicted of hacking into the company's cloud servers to steal customer data and use computer power to mine cryptocurrency. The ex-employee was able to download the personal information of more than 100 million Capital One customers.

In June 2022, AWS announced they had launched the AWS Snowcone, a small computing device, to the International Space Station on the Axiom Mission 1.

In September 2023, AWS announced it would become AI startup Anthropic's primary cloud provider. Amazon has committed to investing up to $4 billion in Anthropic and will have a minority ownership position in the company. AWS also announced the GA of Amazon Bedrock, a fully managed service that makes foundation models (FMs) from leading AI companies available through a single application programming interface (API).

In April 2024, AWS announced a new service called Deadline Cloud, which lets customers set up, deploy and scale up graphics and visual effects rendering pipelines on AWS cloud infrastructure.

In July 2024, AWS won a $1.3 billion (A$2 billion) contract with Australia's government to build a top-secret cloud service. The service included a partnership with the Australian Signals Directorate (ASD). The ASD director general Rachel Noble said the service would "provide a state-of-the-art collaborative space for our intelligence and defense community to store and access top-secret data”.

In December 2024, AWS announced Amazon Nova, its own family of foundation models. These models, offered through Amazon Bedrock, are designed for various tasks including content generation, video understanding, and building agentic applications. They are available in six different sizes. At the end of 2024, AWS announced Project Rainier, a massive one-of-a-kind machine "designed to usher in the next generation of AI."

In February 2026, India's National Informatics Centre (NIC), a department under the Ministry of Electronics and Information Technology, announced deployment of AWS Outposts within its data centers as part of the government's Meghraj 2.0 hybrid cloud initiative, working with Indian data center provider Yotta Data Services. The deployment enables sensitive government workloads to remain within NIC's physical infrastructure while accessing AWS cloud services including Amazon EKS, Amazon RDS, and Amazon S3.

In March and April of 2026, during the 2026 Iran War, Iranian drone and missile strikes damaged AWS data centers in the United Arab Emirates (me-central-1) and Bahrain (me-south-1) regions, in the first deliberate military targeting of a commercial data center. Iran claimed the data centers hosted US military workloads. AWS advised customers to migrate to other regions.

On 30 June 2026, AWS Secret Cloud for Industry (ASCI) was made generally available. It holds a Provisional Authorization at Impact Level 6 from the Defense Information Systems Agency and uses the same Defense Counterintelligence and Security Agency (DCSA) compliance framework that cleared defense contractors already use for on-premises classified systems. Northrop Grumman was the first defense contractor to deploy classified workloads on ASCI. To speed up the migration and to attract customers AWS launched ASCI Accelerator Initiative. The U.S. Intelligence Community (IC) launched IC Accelerated Modernization Framework (ICAMF) which subsidizes transfer to AWS from on-site systems. ASCI provides physically and logically isolated environment purpose-built to meet the most demanding security and compliance requirements. They also created AWS Forward Deployed Engineering (FDE) organization. It embeds AWS frontier teams—working with purpose-built agents—directly inside customer teams (business, engineering, and security teams) to build and deploy production AI systems with their data, governance, and processes.

=== Customer base ===
In October 2013, AWS was awarded a $600M contract with the CIA.

By 2019, it was reported that more than 80% of Germany's listed DAX companies used AWS. In August 2019, the U.S. Navy said it moved 72,000 users from six commands to an AWS cloud system as a first step toward pushing all of its data and analytics onto the cloud.

In January 2021, Amazon announced that it would suspend Parler from Amazon Web Services, stating Parler hosted “violent content” that violates its terms of service. Later in 2021, DISH Network announced it would develop and launch its 5G network on AWS. It was also reported that spy agencies and government departments in the UK, such as GCHQ, MI5, MI6, and the Ministry of Defence, contracted AWS to host their classified materials.

In 2022, Amazon shared a $9 billion contract from the United States Department of Defense for cloud computing with Google, Microsoft, and Oracle.

AWS won a $581 million contract from the U.S. Air Force in January 2026 to provide cloud services and specific Amazon data centers as part of the Cloud One Program, the Air Force's enterprise cloud environment.

Multiple financial services firms have shifted to AWS in some form. Notable customers include NASA and the Obama presidential campaign of 2012.

=== Significant service outages ===
- On April 20, 2011, AWS suffered a major outage. Parts of the Elastic Block Store service became "stuck" and could not fulfill read/write requests. It took at least two days for the service to be fully restored.
- On June 29, 2012, several websites that rely on Amazon Web Services were taken offline due to a severe storm in Northern Virginia, where AWS's largest data center cluster is located.
- On October 22, 2012, a major outage occurred, affecting many sites including Reddit, Foursquare, and Pinterest. The cause was a memory leak bug in an operational data collection agent.
- On December 24, 2012, AWS suffered another outage causing websites such as Netflix to be unavailable for customers in the Northeastern United States. AWS cited their Elastic Load Balancing service as the cause.
- On February 28, 2017, AWS experienced a massive outage of S3 services in its Northern Virginia region. A majority of websites that relied on AWS S3 either hung or stalled, and Amazon reported within five hours that AWS was fully online again. No data has been reported to have been lost due to the outage. The outage was caused by a human error made while debugging, that resulted in removing more server capacity than intended, which caused a domino effect of outages.
- On November 25, 2020, AWS experienced several hours of outage on the Kinesis service in North Virginia (US-East-1) region. Other services relying on Kinesis were also affected.
- On December 7, 2021, an outage mainly affected the Eastern United States, disrupting delivery service and streaming.
- On October 20, 2025, AWS suffered a major outage, resulting in platforms including Duolingo, Snapchat, Canva, Reddit, Canvas, Coinbase, Roblox, Fortnite, and Amazon being down.
- From March 1, 2026, UAE and Bahrain regions are unavailable following attacks by the Islamic Revolutionary Guard Corps.

== Availability and topology ==
As of October 2025, AWS has distinct operations in 38 geographical "regions": nine in North America, two in South America, nine in Europe, four in the Middle East, one in Africa, thirteen in the Asia–Pacific, and three in Australia and New Zealand.

Most AWS regions are enabled by default for AWS accounts. Regions introduced after 20 March 2019 are considered to be opt-in regions, requiring a user to explicitly enable them in order for the region to be usable in the account. For opt-in regions, Identity and Access Management (IAM) resources such as users and roles are only propagated to the regions that are enabled.

Each region is wholly contained within a single country and all of its data and services stay within the designated region. Each region has multiple "Availability Zones", which consist of one or more discrete data centers, each with redundant power, networking, and connectivity, housed in separate facilities. Availability Zones do not automatically provide additional scalability or redundancy within a region, since they are intentionally isolated from each other to prevent outages from spreading between zones. Several services can operate across Availability Zones (e.g., S3, DynamoDB) while others can be configured to replicate across zones to spread demand and avoid downtime from failures.

As of December 2014, Amazon Web Services operated an estimated 1.4 million servers across 11 regions and 28 availability zones. The global network of AWS Edge locations consists of over 700 points of presence worldwide, including locations in North America, Europe, Asia, Australia and New Zealand, Africa, and South America.The AWS Cloud spans 120 Availability Zones within 38 Geographic Regions, with announced plans for 10 more Availability Zones and 3 more AWS Regions in the Kingdom of Saudi Arabia, Chile, and the AWS European Sovereign Cloud.

As of March 2024, AWS had announced the planned launch of six additional regions in Malaysia, Mexico, New Zealand, Thailand, Saudi Arabia, and the European Union. In mid March 2023, Amazon Web Services signed a cooperation agreement with the New Zealand Government to build large data centers in New Zealand.

== Pop-up lofts ==
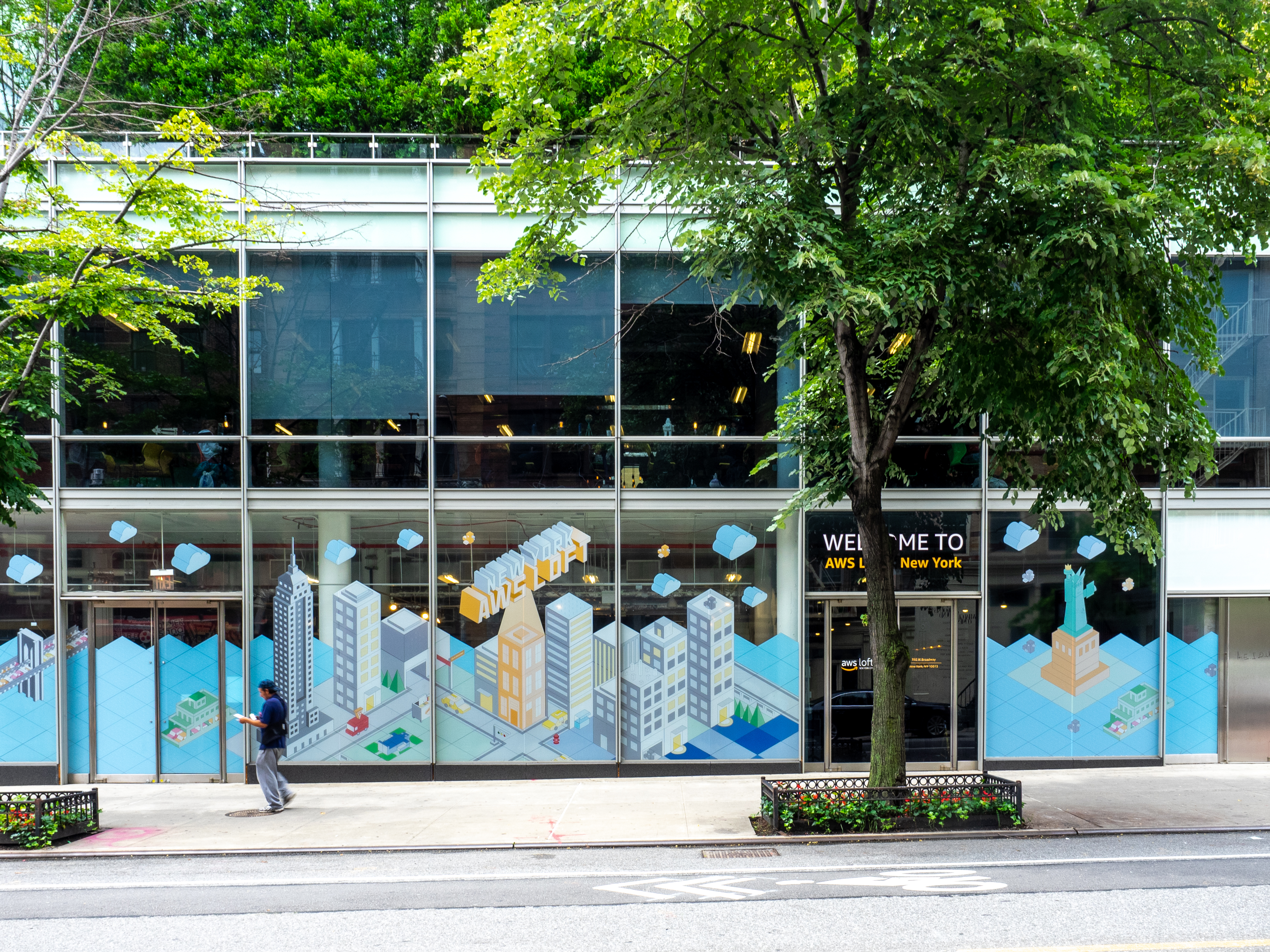
AWS Loft in SoHo, New York City

AWS also has "pop-up lofts" in different locations around the world. These market AWS to entrepreneurs and startups in different tech industries in a physical location. Visitors can work or relax inside the loft, or learn more about what they can do with AWS. In June 2014, AWS opened their first temporary pop-up loft in San Francisco. In May 2015 they expanded to New York City, and in September 2015 expanded to Berlin. AWS opened its fourth location, in Tel Aviv from March 1, 2016, to March 22, 2016. A pop-up loft was open in London from September 10 to October 29, 2015. The pop-up lofts in New York and San Francisco are indefinitely closed due to the COVID-19 pandemic while Tokyo has remained open in a limited capacity.

== Charitable work ==
In 2017, AWS launched AWS re/Start in the United Kingdom to help young adults and military veterans retrain in technology-related skills. In partnership with the Prince's Trust and the Ministry of Defence (MoD), AWS will help to provide re-training opportunities for young people from disadvantaged backgrounds and former military personnel. AWS is working alongside a number of partner companies including Cloudreach, Sage Group, EDF Energy, and Tesco Bank.

In April 2022, AWS announced that the organization had committed more than $30 million over three years to early-stage start-ups led by Black, Latino, LGBTQIA+, and women founders as part of its AWS impact Accelerator. The Initiative offers qualifying start-ups up to $225,000 in cash, credits, extensive training, mentoring, technical guidance and includes up to $100,000 in AWS service credits.

== Reception ==
=== Environmental footprint ===
In 2014, AWS claimed its aim was to achieve 100% renewable energy usage in the future. In the United States, AWS's partnerships with renewable energy providers include Community Energy of Virginia, to support the US East region; Pattern Development, in January 2015, to construct and operate Amazon Wind Farm Fowler Ridge; Iberdrola Renewables, LLC, in July 2015, to construct and operate Amazon Wind Farm US East; EDP Renewables North America, in November 2015, to construct and operate Amazon Wind Farm US Central; and Tesla Motors, to apply battery storage technology to address power needs in the US West (Northern California) region.

In 2016, Greenpeace assessed major tech companies—including cloud services providers like AWS, Microsoft, Oracle, Google, IBM, Salesforce and Rackspace—based on their level of "clean energy" usage. Greenpeace evaluated companies on their mix of renewable-energy sources; transparency; renewable-energy commitment and policies; energy efficiency and greenhouse-gas mitigation; renewable-energy procurement; and advocacy. The group gave AWS an overall "C" grade. Greenpeace credited AWS for its advances toward greener computing in recent years and its plans to launch multiple wind and solar farms across the United States. The organization stated that Amazon is opaque about its carbon footprint.

In January 2021, AWS joined an industry pledge to achieve climate neutrality of data centers by 2030, the Climate Neutral Data Centre Pact. As of 2023, Amazon as a whole is the largest corporate purchaser of renewable energy in the world, a position it has held since 2020, and has a global portfolio of over 20 GW of renewable energy capacity. In 2022, 90% of all Amazon operations, including data centers, were powered by renewables. In 2024, AWS paid $650 million for a data center at the 2.5 GW Susquehanna nuclear power plant, connected at 300 MW. In 2025, AWS signed an $18 billion power purchase agreement with the station for 840—1,200 MW in 2029 and 1,680—1,920 MW in 2032, continuing to 2042. The power increase depends on Amazon's expansion of the data center.

=== Denaturalization protest ===
US Department of Homeland Security has employed the software ATLAS, which runs on Amazon Cloud. It scanned more than 16.5 million records of naturalized Americans and flagged approximately 124,000 of them for manual analysis and review by USCIS officers regarding denaturalization. Some of the scanned data came from the Terrorist Screening Database and the National Crime Information Center. The algorithm and the criteria for the algorithm were secret. Amazon faced protests from its own employees and activists for the anti-migrant collaboration with authorities.

=== Israeli–Palestinian conflict ===
The contract for Project Nimbus drew rebuke and condemnation from the companies' shareholders as well as their employees, over concerns that the project would lead to abuses of Palestinians' human rights in the context of the ongoing occupation and the Israeli–Palestinian conflict. Specifically, they voice concern over how the technology will enable further surveillance of Palestinians and unlawful data collection on them as well as facilitate the expansion of Israel's illegal settlements on Palestinian land. A government procurement document featuring 'obligatory customers' of Nimbus, including "two of Israel’s leading state-owned weapons manufacturers" Israel Aerospace Industries and Rafael Advanced Defense Systems, was published in 2021 with periodic updates since (up to Oct 2023).

=== Work with sanctioned companies ===
AWS has been noted to work with Chinese companies under varying degrees of U.S. government sanctions, such as Hikvision and Dahua Technology, which have been accused to enabling mass surveillance and human rights abuses in China and elsewhere.

== Security incidents ==
=== Amazon Q Developer Extension supply-chain vulnerability (2025) ===
In July 2025, a security researcher disclosed a supply-chain vulnerability in the Amazon Q Developer Extension (version 1.84) for Visual Studio Code. The issue involved a malicious pull request to the project's GitHub repository, which introduced a prompt instructing the AI assistant to delete local files and AWS resources. AWS acknowledged the issue in Security Bulletin AWS‑2025‑015 and released version 1.85 to remove the injected prompt. The company stated that no customer systems or data were affected. However, critics including Corey Quinn, writing in Last Week in AWS, questioned the transparency of the response, noting the absence of a changelog entry, a CVE assignment, or a public statement beyond the bulletin.

=== Log4Shell Hot Patch vulnerability ===
In response to the Log4Shell vulnerability, AWS released hot patch solutions to mitigate risks in Java applications across various environments, including standalone servers, Kubernetes clusters, and Elastic Container Service (ECS). These patches were designed for both AWS and non-AWS environments. However, researchers from Unit 42 at Palo Alto Networks identified critical security flaws in these patches that could be exploited for container escape and privilege escalation, potentially granting attackers unauthorized root-level access to the host system. AWS addressed these vulnerabilities by releasing updated patches on April 19, 2022. Users who deployed the initial patches were advised to upgrade to the latest versions to mitigate security risks.

=== Application Load Balancer security issue ===
In April 2024, security researchers from Miggo security identified a configuration vulnerability in AWS Application Load Balancer (ALB) that could allow attackers to bypass access controls and compromise web applications. The issue stemmed from how some users configured ALB's authentication handoff to third-party services, potentially enabling unauthorized access to application data. On July 11, 2024, AWS confirmed the issue affecting its customers, and on July 19, 2024, AWS updated its documentation accordingly to recommend more secure implementation practices.

In 2026, Amazon Web Services (AWS) data center infrastructure in the United Arab Emirates and Bahrain experienced service disruptions following reported drone strikes in the region. According to Datacenter Dynamics and Reuters, some facilities were affected, resulting in partial damage to physical infrastructure and temporary reductions in service availability for enterprise customers. reports indicated that full recovery of services in the affected regions could take several months, with some services being moved to other cloud regions.

== Issues ==
Some AWS customers have complained about receiving unexpectedly large bills, commonly referred to as "surprise bills." This can occur due to various reasons, including but not limited to misconfigurations, security breaches, complex pricing—especially when multiple AWS services are used together—and unexpected data transfer charges.

== Pricing ==
=== Data transfer charges ===
AWS applies charges for data transferred both between Availability Zones within the same region (inter-AZ) and across different geographic regions (inter-region). The pricing structure is influenced by several factors, including the source and destination of the data, the specific AWS services in use, and the underlying networking architecture. Various services implement different data transfer models, and the choice of communication method—such as VPC Peering, Transit Gateway, or AWS PrivateLink—can also affect the overall cost.

== See also ==
- Cloud-computing comparison
- Comparison of file hosting services
- James Gosling – Canadian computer scientist (born 1955)
- Tim Bray – Canadian software developer (born 1955)
