= Amazon Aurora =

Relational database service

- Developer(s): Amazon.com
- Initial release: October 2014; 10 years ago
- Operating system: Cross-platform
- Available in: English
- Type: relational database SaaS
- License: Proprietary
- Website: aws.amazon.com/rds/aurora/

Amazon Aurora is a proprietary relational database offered as a service by Amazon Web Services (AWS) since October 2014. Aurora is available as part of the Amazon Relational Database Service (RDS).

== History ==
Aurora offered MySQL compatible service upon its release in 2014. It added PostgreSQL compatibility in October 2017.

In August 2017, Aurora Fast Cloning (copy-on-write) feature was added allowing customers to create copies of their databases. In May 2018, Aurora Backtrack was added which allows developers to rewind database clusters without creating a new one. It became possible to stop and start Aurora Clusters in September 2018. In August 2018, Amazon began to offer a serverless version.

In 2019 the developers of Aurora won the SIGMOD Systems Award for fundamentally redesigning relational database storage for cloud environments.

== Features ==
Aurora automatically allocates database storage space in 10-gigabyte increments, as needed, up to a maximum of 128 terabytes. Aurora offers automatic, six-way replication of those chunks across three availability zones for improved availability and fault-tolerance.

Aurora provides users with performance metrics, such as query throughput and latency. It provides fast database cloning.

Aurora Multi-Master allows creation of multiple read-write instances in an Aurora database across multiple availability zones, which enables uptime-sensitive applications to achieve continuous write availability through instance failure.

Amazon designed Aurora to be compatible with MySQL, meaning that tools for querying or managing MySQL databases (such as the mysql command-line client and the MySQL Workbench graphical user-interface) can be used. As of December 2021, Amazon Aurora is compatible with MySQL 5.6, 5.7, and 8.0. It supports InnoDB as a storage engine.

== See also ==
- Amazon Relational Database Service
- Amazon DocumentDB
