= Amazon Relational Database Service =

Cloud-based service

- Developer: Amazon.com
- Release: October 26, 2009; 16 years ago
- Operating system: Cross-platform
- Available in: English
- Type: Relational database SaaS
- License: Proprietary
- Website: aws.amazon.com/rds/

Amazon Relational Database Service (or Amazon RDS) is a distributed relational database service by Amazon Web Services (AWS). It is a web service running "in the cloud" designed to simplify the setup, operation, and scaling of a relational database for use in applications. Administration processes like patching the database software, backing up databases and enabling point-in-time recovery are managed automatically. Scaling storage and compute resources can be performed by a single API call to the AWS control plane on-demand. AWS does not offer an SSH connection to the underlying virtual machine as part of the managed service.

== History ==
Amazon RDS was first released on 26 October 2009, supporting MySQL databases. This was followed by support for Oracle Database in June 2011, Microsoft SQL Server in May 2012, PostgreSQL in November 2013, and MariaDB (a fork of MySQL) in October 2015, and an additional 80 features during 2017.

In November 2014 AWS announced Amazon Aurora, a MySQL-compatible database offering enhanced high availability and performance, and in October 2017 a PostgreSQL-compatible database offering was launched.

In March 2019 AWS announced support of PostgreSQL 11 in RDS, five months after official release.

== Features ==
New database instances can be launched from the AWS Management Console or using the Amazon RDS APIs. Amazon RDS offers different features to support different use cases. Some of the major features are:

=== Multi-Availability Zone (AZ) deployment ===
In May 2010 Amazon announced Multi-Availability Zone deployment support. Amazon RDS Multi-Availability Zone (AZ) allows users to automatically provision and maintain a synchronous physical or logical "standby" replica, depending on database engine, in a different Availability Zone (independent infrastructure in a physically separate location). Multi-AZ database instance can be developed at creation time or modified to run as a Multi-AZ deployment later. Multi-AZ deployments aim to provide enhanced availability and data durability for MySQL, MariaDB, Oracle, PostgreSQL and SQL Server instances and are targeted for production environments. In the event of planned database maintenance or unplanned service disruption, Amazon RDS automatically fails over to the up-to-date standby, allowing database operations to resume without administrative intervention.

Multi-AZ RDS instances are optional and have a cost associated with them. When creating a RDS instance, the user is asked if they would like to use a Multi-AZ RDS instance. In Multi-AZ RDS deployments backups are done in the standby instance so I/O activity is not suspended any time but users may experience elevated latencies for a few minutes during backups.

=== Read replicas ===
Read replicas allow different use cases such as to scale in for read-heavy database workloads. There are up to five replicas available for MySQL, MariaDB, and PostgreSQL. Instances use the native, asynchronous replication functionality of their respective database engines. They have no backups configured by default and are accessible and can be used for read scaling. MySQL and MariaDB read replicas can be made writeable again since October 2012; PostgreSQL read replicas do not support it. Replicas are done at database instance level and do not support replication at database or table level.

=== Performance metrics and monitoring ===
Performance metrics for Amazon RDS are available from the AWS Management Console or the Amazon CloudWatch API. In December 2015, Amazon announced an optional enhanced monitoring feature that provides an expanded set of metrics for the MySQL, MariaDB, and Aurora database engines.

=== RDS costs ===
Amazon RDS instances are priced very similarly to Amazon Elastic Compute Cloud (EC2). RDS is charged per hour and comes in two packages: On-Demand DB Instances and Reserved DB Instances. On-Demand Instances are at an ongoing hourly usage rate. Reserved RDS Instances are offered in one-year and three-year terms and include no-upfront, partial-upfront, and all-upfront payment options. Currently, AWS does not offer a three-year reservation with a "no-upfront" payment option.

Apart from the hourly cost of running the RDS instance, users are charged for the amount of storage provisioned, data transfers and input and output operations performed. AWS have introduced Provisioned Input and Output Operations, in which the user can define how many IO per second are required by their application. IOPS can contribute significantly to the total cost of running the RDS instance.

Amazon RDS also has an Aurora Serverless option. The serverless pricing unit is dollars per ACU (Aurora Capacity Unit) hour. This option is designed for customers that need to dramatically scale workloads.

As part of the AWS Free Tier, the Amazon RDS Free Tier helps new AWS customers get started with a managed database service in the cloud for free. One can use the Amazon RDS Free Tier to develop new applications, test existing applications, or simply gain hands-on experience with Amazon RDS.

=== Automatic backups ===
Amazon RDS creates and saves automated backups of RDS DB instances. The first snapshot of a DB instance contains the data for the full DB instance and subsequent snapshots are incremental, maximum retention period is 35 days. In Multi-AZ RDS deployments backups are done in the standby instance so I/O activity is not suspended for any amount of time but yoneou may experience elevated latencies for a few minutes during backups.

=== Operation ===
Database instances can be managed from the AWS Management Console, using the Amazon RDS APIs and using AWS CLI. Since 1 June 2017, one can stop AWS RDS instances from AWS Management Console or AWS CLI for 7 days at a time. After 7 days, it will be automatically started, and since September 2018 RDS instances can be protected from accidental deletion. Increase DB space is supported, but not decrease allocated space. Additionally there is at least a six-hour period where new allocation cannot be done.

== Database instance types ==
As of August 2020, Amazon RDS supports 82 DB instance types - to support different types of workloads:

- General Purpose: 31 instances
- Memory Optimized: 33 instances
- Previous Generation: 18 instances

=== General purpose ===
Instance type	Memory	EBS optimized / throughput	Cores	Network performance
db.t2.micro	1 GB	—N/a	1 cores	Low to moderate
db.t2.small	2 GB	—N/a	1 cores	Low to moderate
db.t2.medium	4 GB	—N/a	2 cores	Low to moderate
db.t2.large	8 GB	—N/a	2 cores	Low to moderate
db.t2.xlarge	16 GB	—N/a	4 cores	Moderate
db.t2.2xlarge	32 GB	—N/a	8 cores	Moderate
db.t3.micro	1 GB	—N/a	2 cores	Up to 5 Gbps
db.t3.small	2 GB	—N/a	2 cores	Up to 5 Gbps
db.t3.medium	4 GB	—N/a	2 cores	Up to 5 Gbps
db.t3.large	8 GB	—N/a	2 cores	Up to 5 Gbps
db.t3.xlarge	16 GB	—N/a	4 cores	Up to 5 Gbps
db.t3.2xlarge	32 GB	—N/a	8 cores	Up to 5 Gbps
db.m4.large	8 GB	450 Mbit/s	2 cores	Moderate
db.m4.xlarge	16 GB	750 Mbit/s	4 cores	High
db.m4.2xlarge	32 GB	1000 Mbit/s	8 cores	High
db.m4.4xlarge	64 GB	2000 Mbit/s	16 cores	High
db.m4.10xlarge	160 GB	4000 Mbit/s	40 cores	10 Gigabit
db.m4.16xlarge	256 GB	10000 Mbit/s	64 cores	25 Gigabit
db.m5.large	8 GB	up to 3500 Mbit/s	2 cores	Up to 10 Gbps
db.m5.xlarge	16 GB	up to 3500 Mbit/s	4 cores	Up to 10 Gbps
db.m5.2xlarge	32 GB	up to 3500 Mbit/s	8 cores	Up to 10 Gbps
db.m5.4xlarge	64 GB	3500 Mbit/s	16 cores	Up to 10 Gbps
db.m5.12xlarge	192 GB	7000 Mbit/s	48 cores	10 Gigabit
db.m5.24xlarge	384 GB	14000 Mbit/s	96 cores	25 Gigabit
db.m6g.large	8 GB	Up to 4750 Mbit/s	2 cores	Up to 10 Gbps
db.m6g.xlarge	16 GB	Up to 4750 Mbit/s	4 cores	Up to 10 Gbps
db.m6g.2xlarge	32 GB	Up to 4750 Mbit/s	8 cores	Up to 10 Gbps
db.m6g.4xlarge	64 GB	4750 Mbit/s	16 cores	Up to 10 Gbps
db.m6g.8xlarge	128 GB	9000 Mbit/s	32 cores	12 Gbps
db.m6g.12xlarge	192 GB	13500 Mbit/s	48 cores	20 Gbps
db.m6g.16xlarge	256 GB	19000 Mbit/s	64 cores	25 Gbps

=== Memory optimized ===
Instance type	Memory	EBS optimized / throughput	Cores	Network performance
db.r4.large	15.25 GB	437 Mbit/s	2 cores	Up to 10 Gbps
db.r4.xlarge	30.5 GB	875 Mbit/s	4 cores	Up to 10 Gbps
db.r4.2xlarge	61 GB	1750 Mbit/s	8 cores	Up to 10 Gbps
db.r4.4xlarge	122 GB	3500 Mbit/s	16 cores	Up to 10 Gbps
db.r4.8xlarge	244 GB	7000 Mbit/s	32 cores	10 Gbps
db.r4.16xlarge	488 GB	14000 Mbit/s	64 cores	25 Gbps
db.r5.large	16 GB	up to 3500 Mbit/s	2 cores	Up to 10 Gbps
db.r5.xlarge	32 GB	up to 3500 Mbit/s	4 cores	Up to 10 Gbps
db.r5.2xlarge	64 GB	up to 3500 Mbit/s	8 cores	Up to 10 Gbps
db.r5.4xlarge	128 GB	3500 Mbit/s	16 cores	Up to 10 Gbps
db.r5.12xlarge	384 GB	7000 Mbit/s	48 cores	10 Gbps
db.r5.24xlarge	768 GB	14000 Mbit/s	96 cores	25 Gbps
db.r6g.large	16 GB	up to 4750 Mbit/s	2 cores	Up to 10 Gbps
db.r6g.xlarge	32 GB	up to 4750 Mbit/s	4 cores	Up to 10 Gbps
db.r6g.2xlarge	64 GB	up to 4750 Mbit/s	8 cores	Up to 10 Gbps
db.r6g.4xlarge	128 GB	4750 Mbit/s	16 cores	Up to 10 Gbps
db.r6g.8xlarge	256 GB	9000 Mbit/s	32 cores	12 Gbps
db.r6g.12xlarge	384 GB	13500 Mbit/s	48 cores	20 Gbps
db.r6g.16xlarge	512 GB	19000 Mbit/s	64 cores	25 Gbps
db.x1e.xlarge	122 GB	500 Mbit/s	4 cores	Up to 10 Gbps
db.x1e.2xlarge	244 GB	1000 Mbit/s	8 cores	Up to 10 Gbps
db.x1e.4xlarge	488 GB	1750 Mbit/s	16 cores	Up to 10 Gbps
db.x1e.8xlarge	976 GB	3500 Mbit/s	32 cores	Up to 10 Gbps
db.x1e.16xlarge	1952 GB	7000 Mbit/s	64 cores	10 Gbps
db.x1e.32xlarge	3904 GB	14000 Mbit/s	128 cores	25 Gbps
db.x1.16xlarge	976 GB	7000 Mbit/s	64 cores	10 Gbps
db.x1.32xlarge	1952 GB	14000 Mbit/s	128 cores	25 Gbps
db.z1d.large	16 GB	—N/a	1 cores	Up to 10 Gbps
db.z1d.xlarge	32 GB	—N/a	2 cores	Up to 10 Gbps
db.z1d.2xlarge	64 GB	—N/a	4 cores	Up to 10 Gbps
db.z1d.3xlarge	96 GB	—N/a	6 cores	Up to 10 Gbps
db.z1d.6xlarge	192 GB	—N/a	12 cores	10 Gbps
db.z1d.12xlarge	384 GB	—N/a	48 cores	25 Gbps

=== Previous generation ===
Instance type	Memory	EBS optimized / throughput	Cores	Network performance
db.t1.micro	0.613 GB	—N/a	1 cores	Very low
db.m1.small	1.7 GB	—N/a	1 cores	Low
db.m1.medium	3.75 GB	—N/a	1 cores	Moderate
db.m1.large	7.5 GB	—N/a	2 cores	Moderate
db.m1.xlarge	15 GB	—N/a	4 cores	High
db.m2.xlarge	17.1 GB	—N/a	2 cores	Moderate
db.m2.2xlarge	34.2 GB	—N/a	4 cores	Moderate
db.m2.4xlarge	68.4 GB	—N/a	8 cores	High
db.m3.medium	3.75 GB	—N/a	1 cores	Moderate
db.m3.large	7.5 GB	—N/a	2 cores	Moderate
db.m3.xlarge	15 GB	500 Mbit/s	4 cores	High
db.m3.2xlarge	30 GB	10000 Mbit/s	8 cores	High
db.cr1.8xl	244 GB	—N/a	32 cores	10 Gigabit
db.r3.large	15.25 GB	—N/a	2 cores	Moderate
db.r3.xlarge	30.5 GB	—N/a	4 cores	Moderate
db.r3.2xlarge	61 GB	—N/a	8 cores	High
db.r3.4xlarge	122 GB	—N/a	16 cores	High
db.r3.8xlarge	244 GB	—N/a	32 cores	10 Gigabit
