= Peterborough Software =

Defunct software and services company

- Formerly: Peterborough Data Processing
- Industry: Payroll and Human Resources Software and Services
- Predecessor: Peterborough Data Processing
- Founded: 1963 in Peterborough, England
- Founder: Ian K. Evans-Gordon
- Defunct: January 2004
- Fate: Acquired
- Successor: Rebus, Northgate Information Solutions
- Headquarters: Peterborough, England
- Brands: Unipay, Uni2000, OpenDoor, PS2000, Unipension, Unipersonnel, Univu, Uniportfolio, Uniconnect, PSenterprise

Peterborough Software was a payroll and human resources software and services company started in Peterborough, England in 1963. It was a pioneer of computerised payroll services and software in the United Kingdom. The company was acquired by Northgate Information Solutions in 2004.

== History ==
=== Early years ===
The company was formed in Peterborough, England in 1963, by Ian K. Evans-Gordon, a programmer at Perkins Engines, Peterborough, using spare capacity on his firm's mainframe computer.

- 1972 – The company launched Unilist, software to analyse the data held on its payroll programme. The company at this time had 18 staff.
- 1975 – Unipersonnel launched; systems updated to enable online data entry instead of batch processing.

=== 1980s ===
- 1987 – PC-Based products (running on MS-DOS), branded PS2000 and using Revelation Software (a Pick based product) released.

=== 1990s ===
- 1996 – An April 1996 article in The Independent reported "The group is the market leader with 73 of the top 100 companies and 20 per cent of the UK working population paid through its systems. Sales have grown from pounds 7m to pounds 30m since 1986".
- 1997 – The company became part of the newly formed Rebus Group, formed from (inter alia) Peterborough Software and Septre Computer Services.
- 1999 – Rebus Software was named as the leading UK systems supplier for HR and Payroll in a survey conducted as part of the annual Computers in Personnel event.
- 1999 – Rebus was taken private by Warburg Pincus and General Atlantic at a cost of £172 million.

=== 2000s ===
- 2004 – The company was bought by Northgate in early 2004 for £153 million.

== See also ==
- MultiValue The original NoSQL database predating Oracle, SQL Server
