= MDIS =

MDIS may refer to:

- McDonnell Douglas Information Systems, now known as NEC Software Solutions
- Management Development Institute of Singapore
- Mercury Dual Imaging System, carried on the MESSENGER space probe
