= Circle Commerce =

American accounting software company

- Industry: Software
- Founded: 1991
- Founder: Frank Hanshaw III
- Headquarters: Windsor, Connecticut, United States
- Products: Order Management Software
- Website: circlecommerce.com

Circle Commerce is an American order management software company located in Windsor, Connecticut, United States.

== History ==
Circle Commerce was founded in 1991 under the name Avexxis Corporation by former consultants from a major accounting firm. In 2011, the company re-branded itself as Circle Commerce and in 2012, received financing the state of Connecticut's Department of Economic and Community Development (DECD), who awarded the company a $250,000 loan and $100,000 grant as part of the state's Business Express Program.

Circle Commerce has customers such as C.C. Filson, and Herrington Catalog.

== Products ==
Circle Commerce's flagship product is Circle Commerce Manager, a complete order management software system. It contains modules such as sales (order entry), products, marketing, customers, purchasing, warehouse, maintenance, general ledger, accounts payable, accounts receivable, human resources, utilities, DBA, as well as full shipping and selling channel integration, including Amazon.com, eBay, FedEx, and UPS.

Circle Commerce Manager is powered by Rocket UniVerse.
