= Access query language =

Access, the successor to ENGLISH, is an English-like query language used in the Pick operating system.

The original name ENGLISH is something of a misnomer, as PICK's flexible dictionary structure meant that file and attribute names could be given aliases in any natural language. For instance the command SORT could be given the alias TRIEZ, the file CUSTOMER the alias CLIENT, the attribute BALANCE the alias BILAN and the particle BY the alias PAR. This would allow the database to be interrogated using the French-language command string "TRIEZ CLIENT PAR BILAN", resulting in a list of customers by balance.

== Etymology ==
The Access query (or enquiry) language is known by different names on different implementations of Pick: with English, Info/Access, Inform and Recall all being used.
