= PROIV =

PROIV (pronounced "pro-four"), also known as 'Pro-IV', is a low code development platform owned by Zellis Holdings, a British HR services company.

PROIV was originally developed as a fourth-generation programming language (4GLs). PROIV and other 4GL are aiming to simplify and reduce efforts to create and develop computer programs compared to third-generation programming languages (3GLs) such as Cobol and Fortran.

PROIV's usual application domain is database-centric business applications.

PROIV programs consist of declarative/non-procedural specifications that control the overall structure of the program and database access and that have an implicit sequence of execution (which PROIV programmers refer to as the timing cycle). Procedural subroutines can be added by the programmer; these are written in a 3GL-like language, which PROIV calls "Logic".

== History ==
PROIV was developed by Sushil K. Garg, working in Hawaii in 1976 on a General Automation System. In the early 1980s, it was licensed to McDonnell Information Systems (MDIS).

MDIS converted PROIV to run on their Pick-based systems, and this spin-off was known as ALL (Application Language Liberator).

PROIV was ported to several different platforms by separate teams. Garg brought these ports together as one company, Pro Computer Sciences (PCS), headquartered in Laguna Hills, California. PCS was subsequently acquired by MDIS in 1988.

During the second half of the 1980s, a PROIV team entered the 4GL Grand Prix contests in1987, 1988, and 1990 and the product finished second on each occasion.

In 2000, McDonnell Information Systems changed its name to Northgate Information Solutions.

== Implementation ==
PROIV runs OS-independent application code in an OS-specific virtual machine, allowing a user application to run unaltered on different computing platforms. As of August 2021, Zellis claims support for PROIV on Microsoft Windows (workstation and server), Red Hat Linux, IBM AIX, and Oracle Solaris; with Oracle, SQL Server, PostgreSQL, and IBM C-ISAM as the database backend. (Note: Only very specific combinations of operating system and database versions are supported) (Note: A different and wider range of operating systems were claimed to be supported by earlier PROIV versions, for example IBM mainframe operating systems in 1986.)

The PROIV-supplied "GUI client", which renders the rich-client UI for applications written in PROIV, is based around ActiveX technology and works only on Windows client platforms. Consequently, the programmers' development environments supplied with more-recent PROIV releases also work only on a Windows client platform.

== Major applications ==
- In the United Kingdom it was used in the London congestion charge system.
