= McDonnell Douglas DC-10 Twin =

Proposed wide-body airliner

DC-10 Twin

General information
- Type: Wide-body twin-engine passenger aircraft
- National origin: United States
- Manufacturer: McDonnell Douglas
- Status: Canceled

History
- Developed from: McDonnell Douglas DC-10

The McDonnell Douglas DC-10 Twin was a proposed twin–engine version of the DC-10, a wide-body trijet airliner. The DC-10 Twin was designed to be lighter, simpler, and more fuel-efficient than the original DC-10.

The DC-10 Twin was to compete with the Airbus A300, the first twin-aisle twinjet, but it did not enter production, as there was not enough demand from airlines.

== Development ==
Beginning in 1966, two-engine designs were studied for the DC-10 before the design settled on the three-engine configuration. Later on, a big twin based on the DC-10 cross-section was proposed to Airbus as a 50/50 venture but rejected. In 1971, a shortened DC-10 version with two engines was proposed as a competitor to the Airbus A300.

McDonnell Douglas held a major presentation of the proposed DC-10 Twin at Long Beach, California, and several European airlines were willing to place orders. On July 30, 1973, however, the company's board decided not to give the proposed twin the go-ahead, as no US airline had ordered it. More DC-10 Twin proposals were made, either as a collaboration with a European manufacturer or as a solely McDonnell Douglas product, but none proceeded beyond design studies.

The design when being developed had cost a total of $250 million ($1,344 million in 2024). The proposal was based on a specification from American Airlines in 1966, who wanted a wide-body aircraft smaller than the Boeing 747 yet capable of flying similar long-range routes between airports with shorter runways.

== See also ==
- McDonnell Douglas DC-X-200
