= MultiValue database =

Type of NoSQL database

A MultiValue database is a type of NoSQL and multidimensional database. It is typically considered synonymous with PICK, a database originally developed as the Pick operating system.

MultiValue databases include commercial products from Rocket Software, Revelation, InterSystems, Northgate Information Solutions, ONgroup, and other companies. These databases differ from a relational database in that they have features that support and encourage the use of attributes which can take a list of values, rather than all attributes being single-valued. They are often categorized with MUMPS within the category of post-relational databases, although the data model actually pre-dates the relational model. Unlike SQL-DBMS tools, most MultiValue databases can be accessed both with or without SQL.

== History ==
Don Nelson designed the MultiValue data model in the early to mid-1960s. Dick Pick, a developer at TRW, worked on the first implementation of this model for the US Army in 1965. Pick considered the software to be in the public domain because it was written for the military. This was but the first dispute regarding MultiValue databases that to be addressed by the courts.

Ken Simms wrote DataBASIC, sometimes known as S-BASIC, in the mid-1970s. It was based on Dartmouth BASIC, but had enhanced features for data management. Simms played a lot of Star Trek (a text-based early computer game originally written in Dartmouth BASIC) while developing the language, to ensure that DataBASIC functioned to his satisfaction.

Three of the implementations of MultiValue - PICK version R77, Microdata Reality 3.x, and Prime Information 1.0 - were very similar. In spite of attempts to standardize, particularly by International Spectrum and the Spectrum Manufacturers Association, who designed a logo for all to use, there are no standards across MultiValue implementations. Subsequently, these flavors diverged, although with some cross-over. These streams of MultiValue database development could be classified as one stemming from PICK R83, one from Microdata Reality, and one from Prime Information. Because of the differences, some implementations have provisions for supporting several flavors of the languages. An attempt to document the similarities and differences can be found at the Post-Relational Database Reference (PRDB).

One reasonable hypothesis for this data model lasting 50 years, with new database implementations of the model even in the 21st century is that it provides inexpensive database solutions.

== Data model example ==
In a MultiValue database system:

- A database or schema is called an "account"
- A table or collection is called a "file"
- A column or field is called a field or an "attribute", which can be composed of "multi-value attributes" and "sub-value attributes" to store multiple values in the same attribute.
- A row or document is called a "record" or "item"

Data is stored using two separate files: a "file" to store raw data and a "dictionary" to store the format for displaying the raw data.

For example, assume there's a file (table) called "PERSON". In this file, there is an attribute called "eMailAddress". The eMailAddress field can store a variable number of email address values in a single record. The list "joe@example.com, jdb@example.net, joe_bacde@example.org" can be stored and accessed via a single query when accessing the associated record.

Achieving the same (one-to-many) relationship within a traditional relational database system would include creating an additional table to store the variable number of email addresses associated with a single "PERSON" record. However, modern relational database systems support this multi-value data model too. For example, in PostgreSQL, a column can be an array of any base type.

== MultiValue Basic language ==
Multivalue Basic (now commonly styled as mvBasic) is a family of programming languages more or less common (and portable) to all the multivalue databases derived from the original Pick Operating System. The variations between implementations are known as flavours.

The language originates from Dartmouth Basic and the earliest implementation of PickBASIC (now D3 FlashBasic). Over time various customisations and extensions have been added to take advantage of capabilities added to the different flavours while staying mainly in sync.

mvBasic statements and functions are designed to access and take advantage of the multivalue database model and provide the usual capabilities of most modern languages. The mvBasic language is typeless.

Example code is available but limited. Whilst there are commercial applications and tools available, the multivalue database community has not embraced the open source library/package model to the degree seen with other languages.

The typical mvBasic compiler compiles program source to a P-code executable object and runs in an interpreter, with D3 FlashBasic and jBASE being notable exceptions.

== MultiValue query language ==
Known as ENGLISH, ACCESS, AQL, UniQuery, Retrieve, CMQL, and by many other names over the years, corresponding to the different MultiValue implementations, the MultiValue query language differs from SQL in several respects. Each query is issued against a single dictionary within the schema, which could be understood as a virtual file or a portal to the database through which to view the data.

LIST PEOPLE LAST_NAME FIRST_NAME EMAIL_ADDRESSES WITH LAST_NAME LIKE "Van..."

The above statement would list all e-mail addresses for each person whose last name starts with "Van". A single entry would be output for each person, with multiple lines showing the multiple e-mail addresses (without repeating other data about the person).

== See also ==
- Rocket U2 (UniVerse and UniData)
- OpenQM by Ladybridge Systems
- Reality by Northgate-IS
- Caché by InterSystems
