= McDonnell Douglas DC-X-200 =

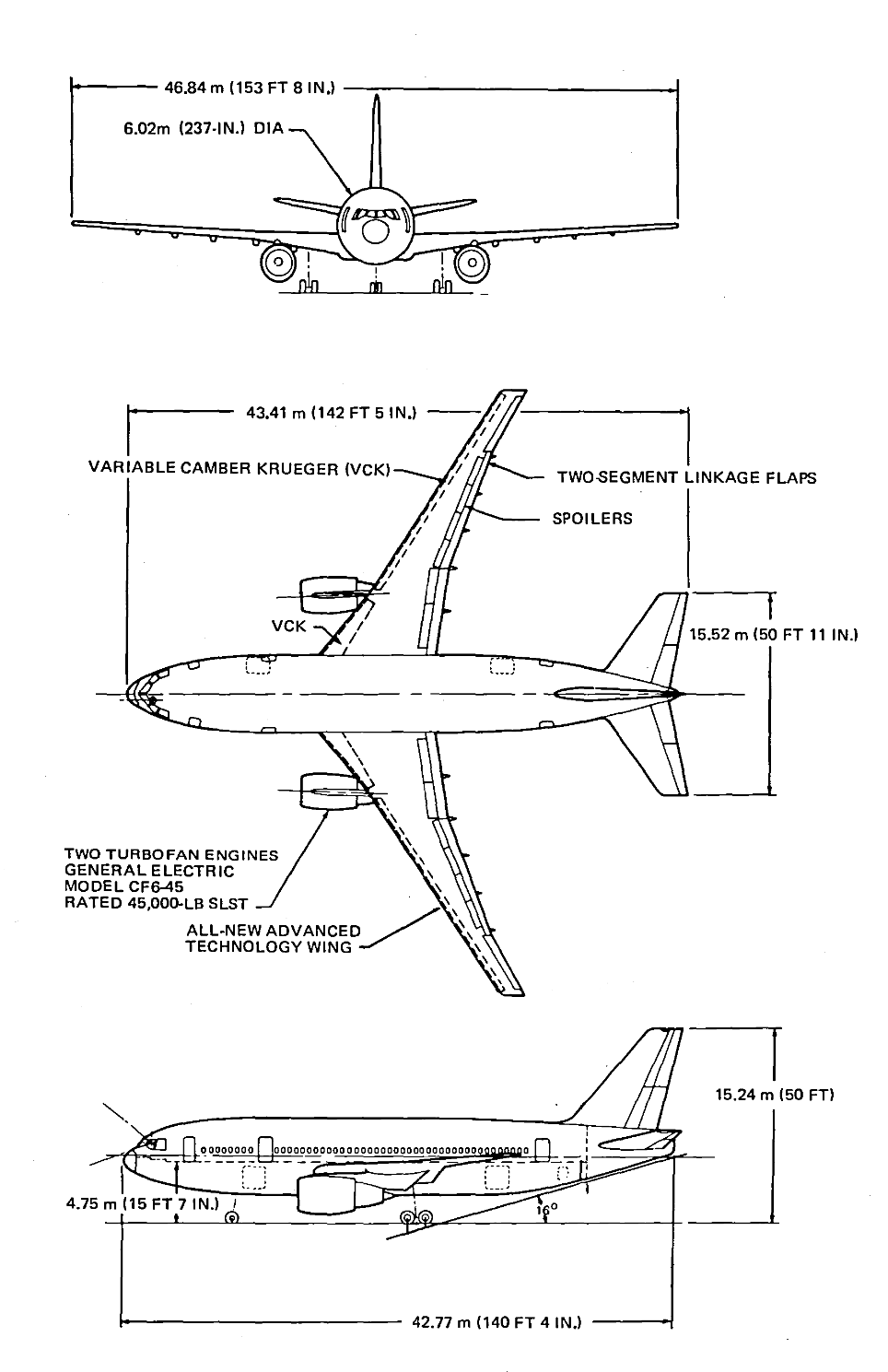
DC-X-200 three-view image

The McDonnell Douglas DC-X-200 was a proposed airliner from McDonnell Douglas in the late 1970s, based on the McDonnell Douglas DC-10, but with a shortened fuselage with a smaller capacity.

It was a shortened DC-10 with the same fuselage cross-section, capacity reduced from 270 to 220 passengers in a 3-class layout, and only two engines under the wings, dropping the DC-10's central tailfin-mounted engine. The engines were General Electric CF6s as in the DC-10, but were planned to be slightly uprated. It addition, the wing was a new design, with a higher aspect ratio and supercritical airfoil. It was designed to compete with the Airbus A310 and Boeing 767, developed in the same era and of similar size.

McDonnell Douglas worked with NASA on the aerodynamic design, and wind tunnel testing was conducted. However the project was dropped in the summer 1978 due to low commercial opportunities.

The NASA report lists the main design features:

- Length: 142.4 feet (43.41 m)
- Wingspan: 153.7 feet (46.84 m)
- Height: 50.0 feet (15.24 m)
- Wing area: 2,400 square feet (220 m^{2})
- Max. Takeoff Weight: 291,000 lb (132 t)
- Engines: Two CF6-45 with 45,000 lbf (200 kN) of thrust each

== See also ==
- McDonnell Douglas DC-10 Twin
