= McDonnell Douglas Barbarian =

The Barbarian was a launch vehicle proposed by McDonnell Douglas in 1987 to lift heavy loads under the Strategic Defence Initiative. The Barbarian could have put the projected Zenith-Star chemical laser into low orbit. It did not go beyond the design phase.

It would have consisted of three solid fuel booster rockets derived from the Space Shuttle Solid Rocket Booster attached to a ring consisting of six main stages of Delta II rockets, which in turn would surround a main stage of Delta II.

== Specifications ==
- Payload: 45,400 kg to low Earth orbit (300 km altitude, 28 degrees inclination).
- Thrust at liftoff: 35,789.56 kN
- Total Mass: 2,500,000 kg
- Overall length: 31 m

== Sources ==
- Wade, Mark (2008). Barbarian MDD
