= NEC Software Solutions =

UK-based software company

- Company logo after its rebranding in July 2021
- Formerly: Northgate Public Services
- Industry: outsourcing & public sector software and services.
- Founded: 1969; 57 years ago
- Area served: Worldwide, based in the United Kingdom
- Key people: Tina Whitley (CEO)
- Products: Former computer manufacturer
- Owners: NEC Corporation
- Number of employees: 1400
- Website: www.necsws.com

NEC Software Solutions UK is a United Kingdom–based software and technology services provider, founded in 1969.

== History ==
=== Early years ===
The company was founded as Computer Machinery Company Limited (CMC) on 18 September 1969 by Ray Parry. CMC initially operated as a distributor and subsequently a manufacturer of key-to-disk computer systems produced by the US-based Computer Machinery Corporation. These systems were used for data capture by commercial and government clients. In 1976, CMC developed the P99, a bit-slice microprocessor-based intelligent terminal that functioned as both a front-end processor to the key-to-disk systems and as a standalone terminal.

The P99 was succeeded by the P141 front-end processor, which formed the basis for Sovereign, a data capture system. Sovereign was adopted by manufacturing companies including Rolls-Royce plc and British Steel Corporation, as well as government departments such as the DHSS facility at Newcastle upon Tyne. The system was later redesigned as the M8000, based on Intel processors.

In 1976, CMC merged with Microdata Corporation, a California-based computer company. Microdata's Reality operating system and database environment, based on the Pick operating system, had been distributed by CMC since 1973. The two companies continued to operate under separate trading names in their respective markets until 1981. Following the merger, CMC Leasing Limited changed its name to Microdata UK Limited (MUK) and began manufacturing the Reality range of computer systems in Hemel Hempstead. In 1985, McDonnell Douglas Corporation acquired Microdata and rebranded the UK operation as McDonnell Douglas Information Systems Limited (MDIS).

MDIS constructed a manufacturing and office complex on Boundary Way, Hemel Hempstead, which was expanded shortly after completion. The company developed the Spirit processor, marketed as the M6000, a lower-end product in the Reality range. Subsequently, a transatlantic development team based in Hemel Hempstead and Irvine, California, developed the Series 19 (also known as Pegasus), a successor to the Sequoia system.

MDIS ceased in-house development of computer systems in 1992, ending domestic hardware manufacturing in the UK. The company continued hardware and systems integration work, developing RealityX, an open platform implementation of the Reality operating environment. RealityX was the product of a multi-year effort to re-engineer the Reality operating system (ROS) as a Unix application capable of running on non-MDIS hardware. The platform maintained compatibility with existing Reality applications at the developer assembler level, using shared source code with the original Reality implementations. RealityX enabled continued sales and maintenance of Reality applications under the SeriesX name. MDIS initially deployed RealityX on Unix systems from Encore Computer, followed by systems from Motorola Computer Systems and Data General, all using M88k RISC processors and Unix System V. The platform was later ported to Solaris-based systems from Sun Microsystems, and in 1995 to Microsoft Windows. During this period, MDIS acquired and developed PROIV, a fourth-generation language (4GL) used internationally by companies including Fujitsu. A variant of PROIV was implemented on Reality under the name ALL (Application Language Liberator). In 1993, a management buyout was completed. Twenty-nine senior managers and directors, led by CEO Jerry Causley, acquired the company from McDonnell Douglas with financing from Barings Bank. The company was floated on the London Stock Exchange in 1994 at an initial share price of £260. Within two months, the share price had declined to below £100. During the latter half of the 1990s, most of the original management team departed and was replaced by new leadership. John Klein was appointed CEO following a profit warning issued to the stock exchange. The company's human resources application products were re-implemented in PROIV. In 1998, the Maylands Park South building in Hemel Hempstead was sold to 3Com; approximately 600 staff were either relocated or made redundant. Chris Stone was appointed CEO in 1999. At that time, the company was reporting annual losses of approximately £100 million. A period of restructuring followed, during which the company refocused on its core markets in local government and public sector services (police, fire, and ambulance) and its principal products (payroll, pensions, and human resources systems). The company also offered hardware maintenance and managed services.

=== 2000s ===
In 2000, the company was rebranded to shed the old loss-making image, and the company changed its name to Northgate Information Solutions—the name of a small software house that the old MDIS company had purchased years earlier. Through "re-focusing" and the loss of about two-thirds of the original MDIS staff, the business finally became profitable again in 2001. Through the sale of the health business unit, the company raised capital for acquisitions.

In 2002, Northgate acquired Prolog (payroll outsourcing services). In 2003, the company acquired CaraPeople (payroll outsourcing), blue8 (location and citizen-centric IT systems for emergency services), Hays CSG (data management information systems (police) and consulting) and PWA Group (HR applications). In 2004, the company acquired Rebus (previously Peterborough Software), one of its main competitors (HR Group, which provides HR and payroll services), and CIM Systems (communication technologies for control room environments). As a result of its larger capitalisation, it became listed on the London Stock Exchange FTSE 250 Index. In 2005, the company acquired Sx3 and MVM Holdings, but a number of the old Northgate staff now felt that they were working for Sx3 due to the integration of their senior managers. In June 2007, Northgate bought ARINSO to create NorthgateArinso (NGA) . NorthgateArinso in 2011 and 2012 was acknowledged in HR and payroll outsourcing by industry analysts such as Gartner, IDC and Everest Research.

On Sunday, 11 December 2005, an explosion and fire at the Buncefield oil depot, located next to the company's Hemel Hempstead offices, destroyed the head office complex. Hemel Hempstead–based staff were subsequently instructed to report to offices in Oxford and Peterborough. The company's share price fell on the first trading day following the incident but recovered later the same day. Managed services systems were transferred to alternative facilities, including a site in Hounslow, using off-site backups as part of the company's disaster recovery arrangements. These systems included managed networks supporting hospitals in East Anglia. All customer payrolls were processed on schedule during this period. Following the incident, chief executive officer Chris Stone spoke publicly on commercial disaster recovery.

In October 2006, the company announced that it had received an unsolicited takeover approach, which did not proceed. In December 2007, Kohlberg Kravis Roberts (KKR) agreed to acquire the company for £593 million.

Private equity giant Kohlberg Kravis Roberts (KKR) acquired Northgate in November 2007 for £593 million. Northgate chairman Ron Mackintosh said the offer from KKR was good value, and he predicted a bright future for the firm under private-equity ownership. The acquisition was completed in March 2008, after which Northgate Information Systems plc was delisted from the London Stock Exchange.[3] In April 2008, the company ranked forty-seventh in Britain's Top Employer 2008.

In November 2008, Northgate Information Solutions UK Ltd acquired Anite Public Sector Holdings Ltd from Anite plc. Convergys sold its Human Resources Management line of business to NorthgateArinso in 2010.

=== 2010s ===
Northgate Managed Services, specialising in managed IT services to the UK mid-market, was acquired by Capita in February 2013. Northgate Public Services was acquired by Cinven in December 2014. In 2017, NGA HR (payroll service organization from Northgate Information Solutions) announced that it had sold its UK Mid-Market and UK SME sections to Bain Capital to focus on the growing demand from enterprise businesses for multi-country HR and payroll services. In 2018 Northgate Public Services is acquired by NEC. The company acquired service design agency Snook in June 2019 and criminal justice software provider i2N in August 2018. It was announced in January 2018 that, following Bain Capital's acquisition of NGA HR's UK and Ireland division, they would rebrand as a separate company providing payroll services under the new name Zellis. The company acquired APD Communications, a software supplier to the emergency services, public safety, and control room markets in January 2019 and the specialist and care division EMIS Health in April 2019. On 22 August 2019, it was announced that Alight Solutions would acquire NGA Human Resources.

=== 2020s ===
Tina Whitley was appointed chief executive officer on 1 April 2021. The company changed its name to NEC Software Solutions UK on 1 July 2021. On 1 October 2021, NEC Software Solutions UK commenced the acquisition of Capita plc's Secure Solutions and Services (SSS) business. The transaction was subject to a review by the Competition and Markets Authority (CMA), which ran from 5 January 2022 to 1 August 2023. During this period, the business operated as an independent company under the name SSS Public Safety Ltd. Following the conclusion of the CMA review, NEC Software Solutions UK completed the acquisition of SSS Public Safety. In August 2025, NEC Software Solutions UK completed the acquisition of Cadcorp Limited.

In January 2026, it was announced that NEC Software Solutions had acquired Meganexus, a specialist software company providing digital services to justice, rehabilitation, and public sector organizations, for an undisclosed sum. Following the acquisition, Meganexus became part of NEC Software Solutions' Digital Studio division, expanding its case management and service delivery capabilities across the justice, healthcare, and government sectors.

== Operations ==
NEC Software Solutions UK operates in four sectors – government, healthcare, housing, and public safety. Offshore software development is provided by a Mumbai-based subsidiary that also specialises in scientific publishing software.

=== Government ===
The company provides software and related services to the four UK governments. It also works with UK local authorities, providing specialist applications and services to support the management of revenues and benefits, housing, environment and planning functions.

=== Healthcare ===
The healthcare division specialises in medical registries and health screening. The company's software has been used to screen millions of babies for hearing loss and other inherited conditions. It also supports national and local diabetic eye screening programmes. The company's work in registries includes supporting the National Joint Registry as well as registries for robotic surgery and spinal treatments. The company announced a new partnership with the Walton Centre NHS Foundation Trust.

=== Housing ===
The company's housing management solution is used to manage millions of homes worldwide. It works with local authorities and registered providers in the UK and also supports customers in Canada and Australia. In May 2020, the solution was selected by Colchester Borough Homes.

=== Public safety ===
This division covers the company's work in policing, emergency services, prisons, probation and critical infrastructure. Products include the CONNECT police platform as well as software supporting offender management, youth justice and major control rooms. In March 2020, subsidiary company APD Communications secured a contract to support the UK Home Office Emergency Services Network. In 2019, NEC Corporation also transferred global sales responsibility for its facial recognition product, NeoFace Watch, to this division.

== See also ==
- MultiValue – the original NoSQL database predating Oracle + SQL Server
