= McDonnell Douglas =

American aerospace company (1967–1997)

- After McDonnell Douglas's merger with Boeing in 1997, a stylized version of this logo was added to the Boeing logo.
- Type: Public
- Traded as: NYSE: MD until the merger with Boeing in 1997. Thereafter the merged companies traded as BA
- Industry: Aerospace
- Predecessor: McDonnell Aircraft Corporation; Douglas Aircraft Company
- Founded: April 28, 1967; 59 years ago
- Defunct: August 1, 1997; 29 years ago
- Fate: Merged with Boeing
- Successor: Boeing
- Headquarters: Berkeley, Missouri, United States
- Key people: Harry Stonecipher (CEO)
- Website: mdc.com at the Wayback Machine (archived July 6, 1997)

McDonnell Douglas Corporation was a major American aerospace manufacturing corporation and defense contractor. It was formed by the merger of McDonnell Aircraft Corporation and the Douglas Aircraft Company in 1967. Between then and its own merger with Boeing in 1997, it produced well-known commercial and military aircraft, such as the DC-10 and the MD-80 airliners, the F-15 Eagle air superiority fighter, F-4E Phantom II fighter-bomber, and the F/A-18 Hornet multirole fighter.

The corporation's headquarters were at St. Louis Lambert International Airport, near St. Louis, Missouri.

== History ==
=== Background ===
The company was formed from the firms of James Smith McDonnell and Donald Wills Douglas in 1967. Both men were of Scottish ancestry, were graduates of the Massachusetts Institute of Technology, and had worked for the aircraft manufacturer Glenn L. Martin Company.

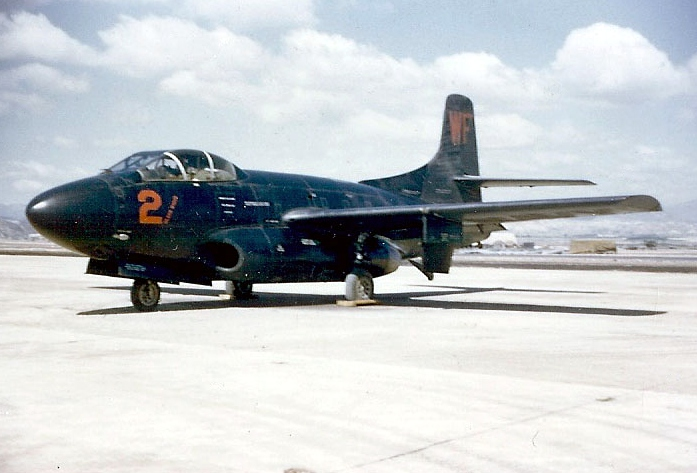
Douglas F3D Skyknight, c. 1952

Douglas had been chief engineer at Martin before leaving to establish Davis-Douglas Company in early 1920 in Los Angeles. The following year, he bought out his backer and renamed the firm the Douglas Aircraft Company.

McDonnell founded J.S. McDonnell & Associates in Milwaukee, Wisconsin, in 1926 to produce a personal aircraft for family use. The economic depression from 1929 ruined his ideas and the company collapsed. He worked at three companies, joining Glenn Martin Company in 1933. He left Martin in 1938 to try again with his own firm, McDonnell Aircraft Corporation, this time based at Lambert Field, outside St. Louis, Missouri.

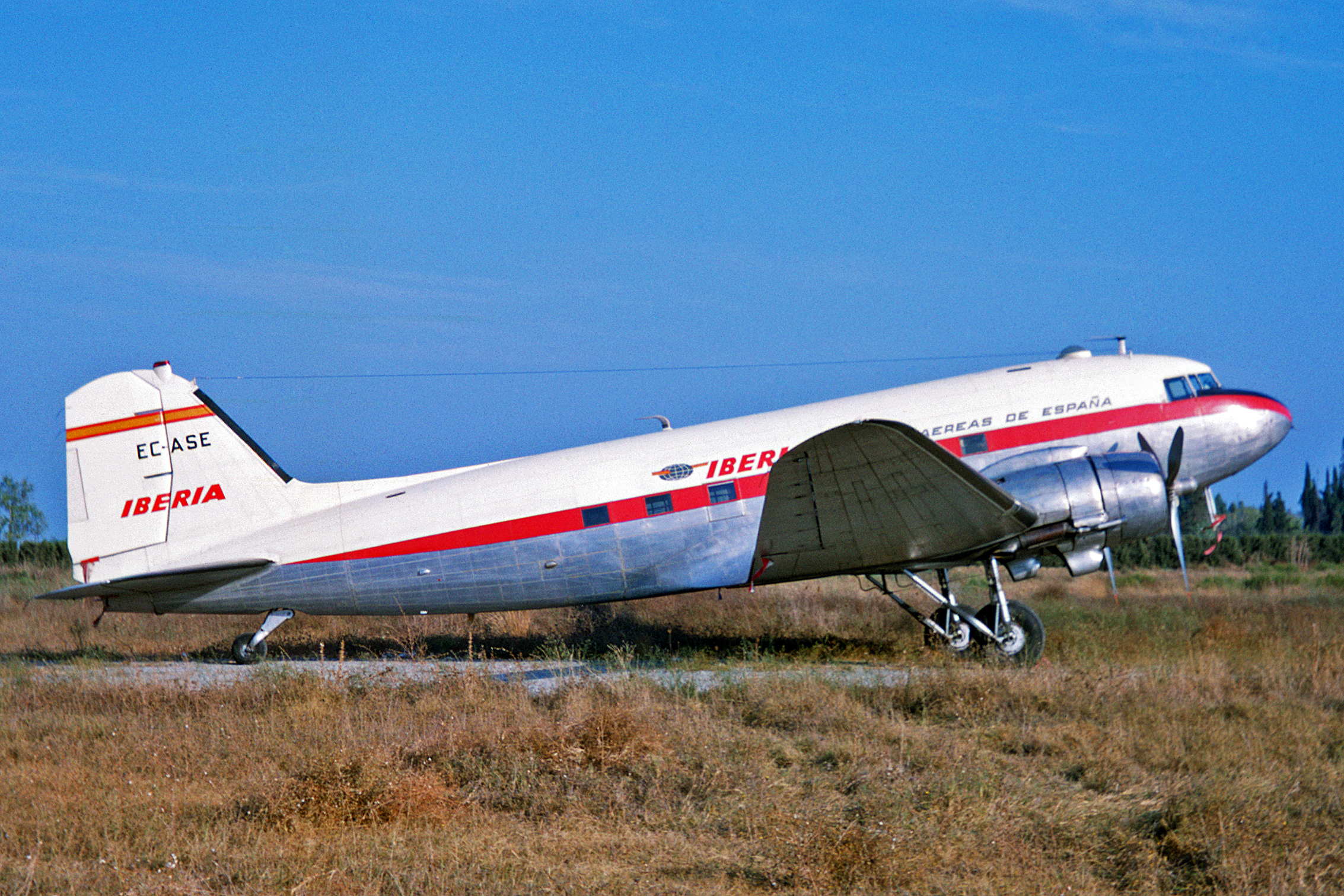
Douglas DC-3 of Iberia

Douglas Aircraft profited during World War II. The company produced about 10,000 C-47s, a military variant of the Douglas DC-3, from 1942 to 1945. The workforce swelled to 160,000.

Both companies suffered at the end of the war, facing an end of government orders and a surplus of aircraft. Douglas continued to develop new aircraft, including the DC-6 in 1946 and the DC-7 in 1953. The company moved into jet propulsion, producing the F3D Skyknight in 1948 and then the more "jet age" F4D Skyray in 1951. In 1955, Douglas introduced the U.S. Navy's first attack jet, the A4D Skyhawk. Designed to operate from the decks of the World War II Essex-class aircraft carriers, the Skyhawk was small, reliable, and tough. Variants of it continued in use in the Navy for almost 50 years, finally serving in large numbers in a two-seat version as a jet trainer.

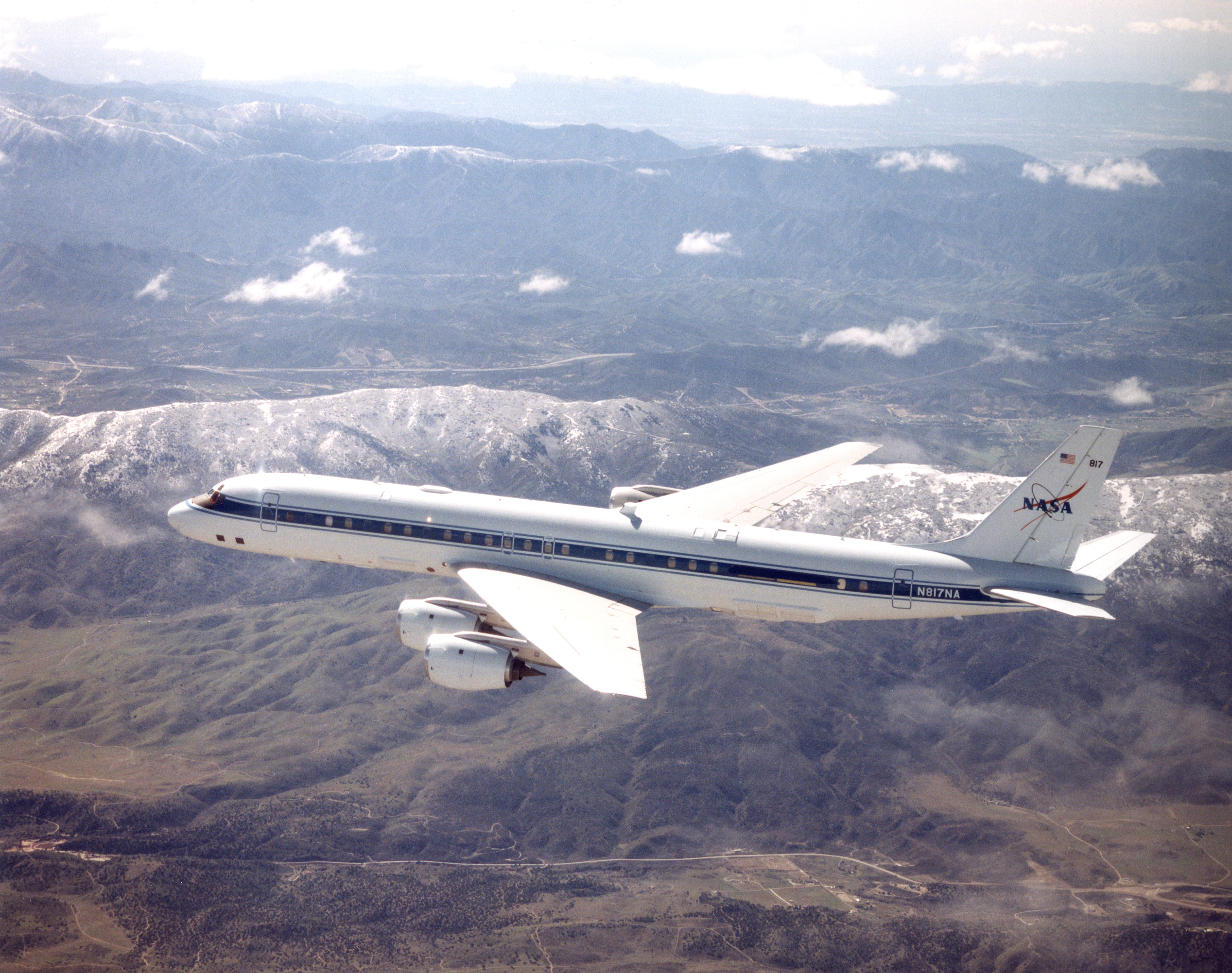
Douglas DC-8

Douglas also made commercial jets, producing the DC-8 in 1958 to compete with the Boeing 707. McDonnell was also developing jets, but being smaller it was prepared to be more radical, building on its successful FH-1 Phantom to become a major supplier to the Navy with the F2H Banshee and F3H Demon; and producing the F-101 Voodoo for the United States Air Force (USAF). The Korean War-era Banshee and later the F-4 Phantom II produced during the Vietnam War helped push McDonnell into a major military fighter supply role. Douglas created a series of experimental high-speed jet aircraft in the Skyrocket family, with the Skyrocket DB-II being the first aircraft to travel at twice the speed of sound in 1953.

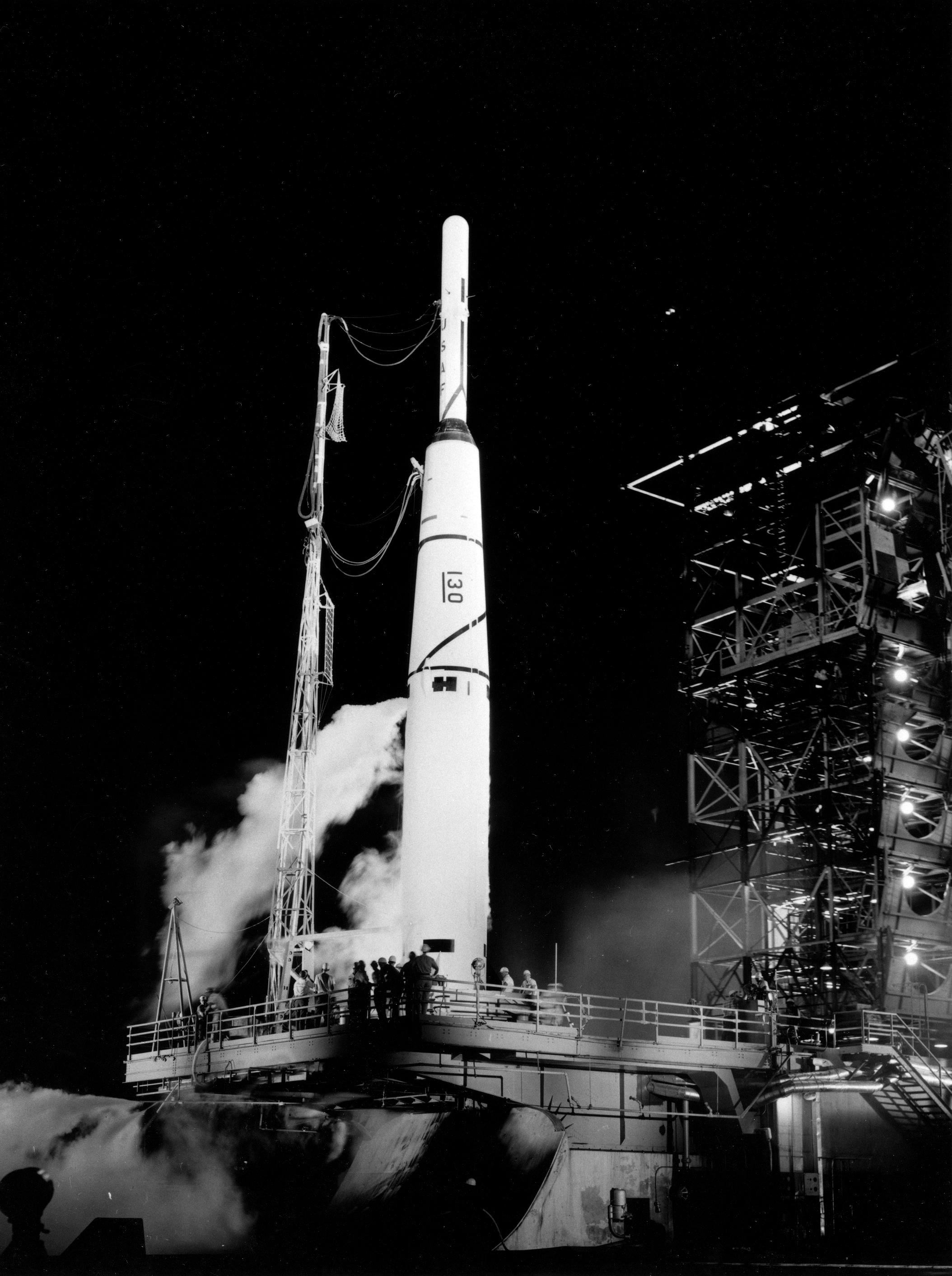
Thor Able with Pioneer 1 at Cape Canaveral, Florida

Both companies were eager to enter the new missile business, Douglas moving from producing air-to-air rockets and missiles to entire missile systems under the 1956 Nike program and becoming the main contractor of the Skybolt ALBM program and the Thor ballistic missile program. McDonnell made a number of missiles, including the unusual ADM-20 Quail, as well as experimenting with hypersonic flight, research that enabled it to gain a substantial share of the NASA projects Mercury and Gemini. Douglas also gained contracts from NASA, notably for part of the enormous Saturn V rocket.

The two companies were now major employers, but both were having problems. McDonnell was primarily a defense contractor, without any significant civilian business. It frequently suffered lean times during downturns in military procurement. Meanwhile, Douglas was strained by the cost of the DC-8 and DC-9. The two companies began to sound each other out about a merger in 1963. Douglas offered bid invitations from December 1966 and accepted that of McDonnell. The two firms were officially merged on April 28, 1967, as the McDonnell Douglas Corporation (MDC). Earlier, McDonnell bought 1.5 million shares of Douglas stock to help its partner meet "immediate financial requirements". The two companies seemed to be a good fit for each other. McDonnell's military contracts provided an instant solution for Douglas' cash flow problems, while the revenue from Douglas' civil contracts would be more than enough for McDonnell to withstand peacetime declines in procurement.

=== Formation ===
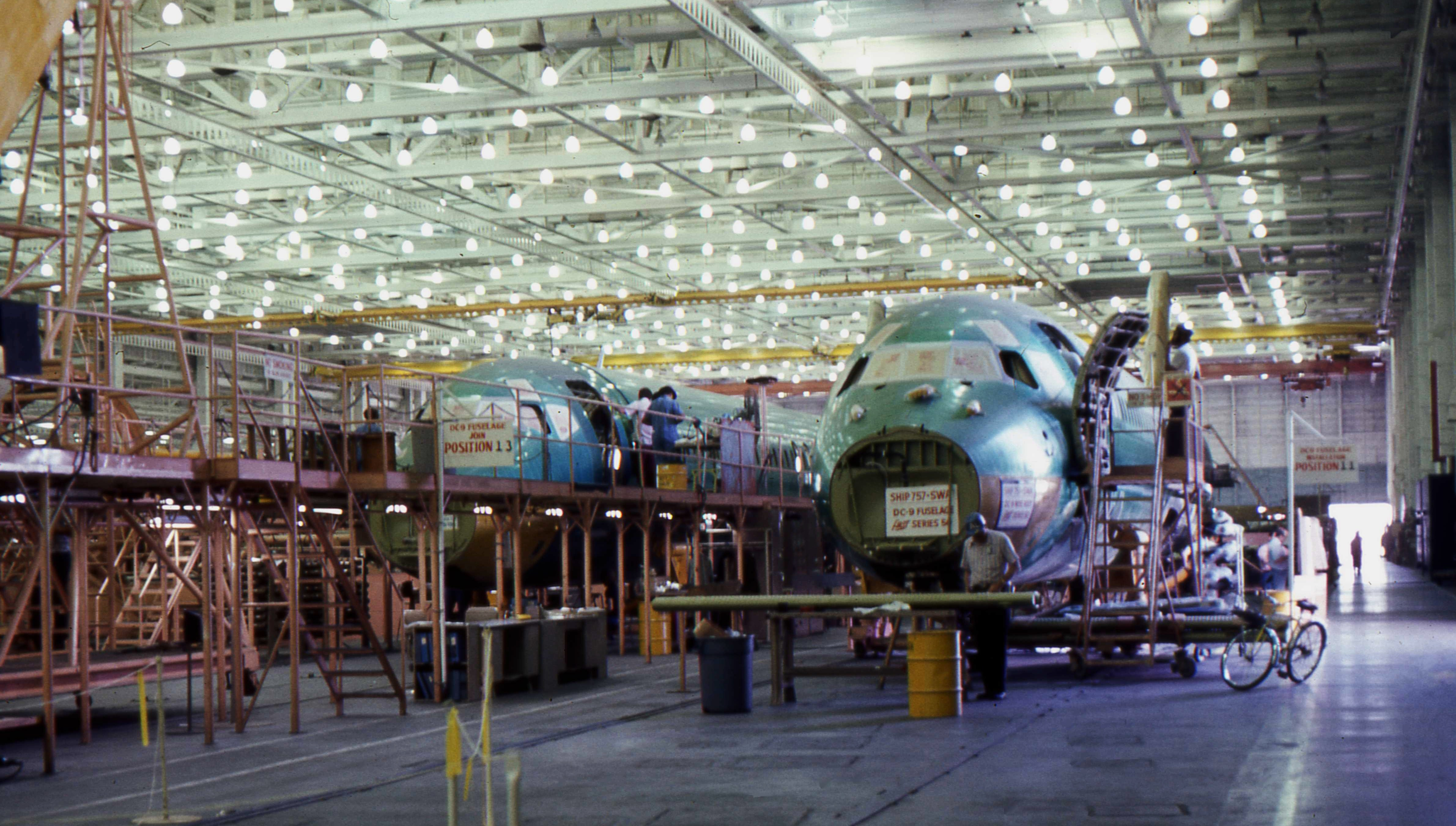
Assembly of the DC-9 and DC-10 at the Long Beach plant, 1974

McDonnell Douglas retained McDonnell Aircraft's headquarters location at what was then known as Lambert–St. Louis International Airport, in Berkeley, Missouri, near St. Louis. James McDonnell became executive chairman and CEO of the merged company, with Donald Douglas Sr. as honorary chairman.

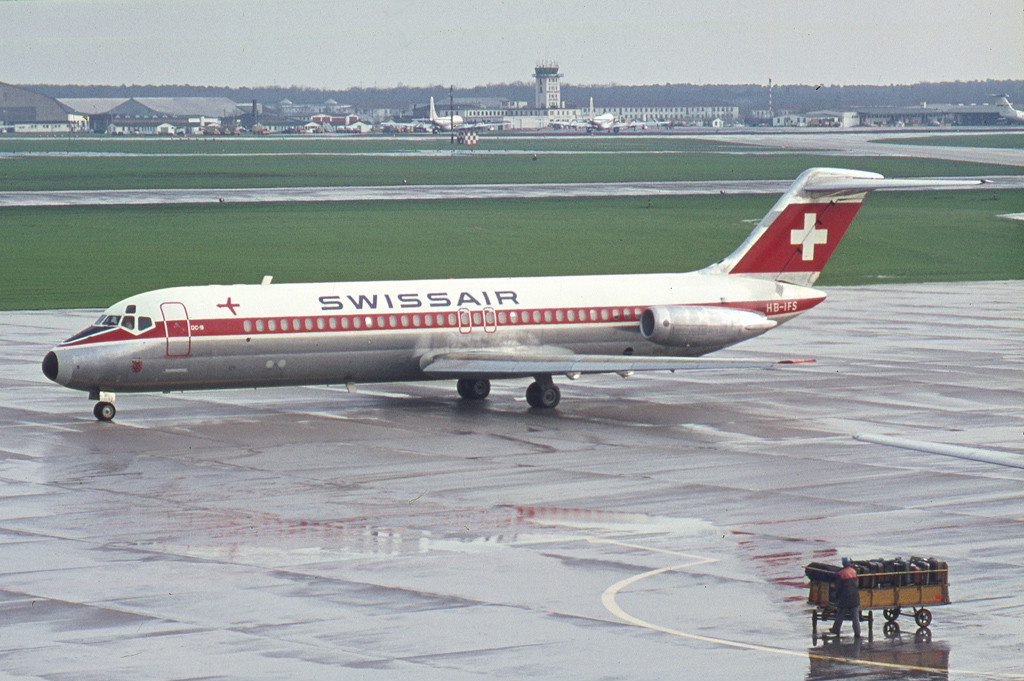
Douglas DC-9-32

In 1967, with the merger of McDonnell and Douglas Aircraft, David S. Lewis, then president of McDonnell Aircraft, was named chairman of what was called the Long Beach, Douglas Aircraft Division. At the time of the merger, Douglas Aircraft was estimated to be less than a year from bankruptcy. Flush with orders, the DC-8 and DC-9 aircraft were 9 to 18 months behind schedule, incurring stiff penalties from the airlines. Lewis was active in DC-10 sales in an intense competition with Lockheed's L-1011, a rival tri-jet aircraft. In two years, Lewis had the operation back on track and in positive cash flow. He returned to the company's St. Louis headquarters where he continued sales efforts on the DC-10 and managed the company as a whole as president and chief operating officer through 1971.

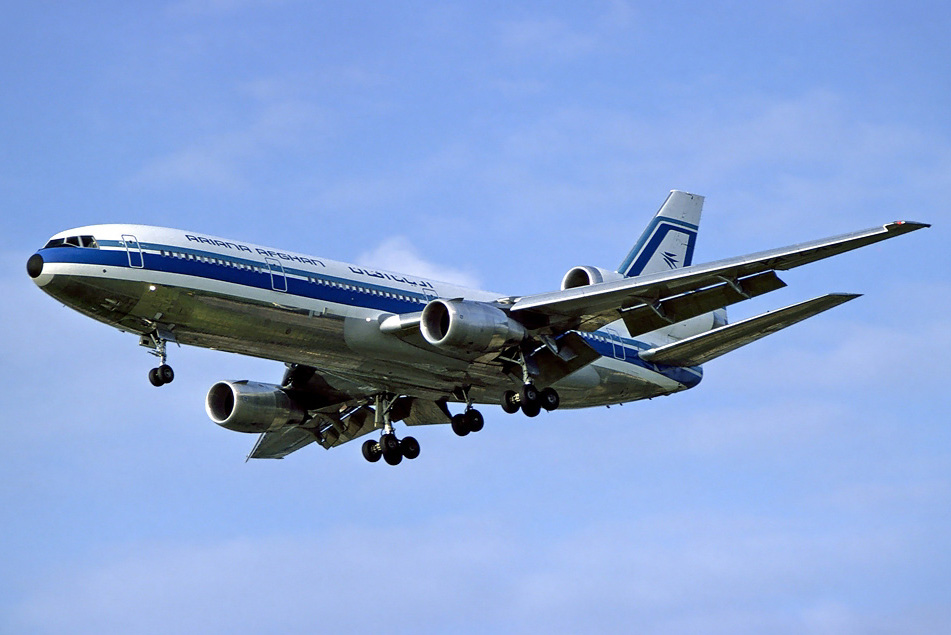
McDonnell Douglas DC-10

The DC-10 began production in 1968 with the first deliveries in 1971.

As early as 1966 and for decades thereafter, McDonnell Douglas considered building a twin-engined aircraft named the "DC-10 Twin" or DC-X. This would have been an early twinjet similar to the Airbus A300, but it never progressed to a prototype. Such an aircraft might have given McDonnell Douglas an early lead in the huge twinjet market that developed in the 1970s, as well as commonality with many of the DC-10's systems.

=== 1970–1980 ===
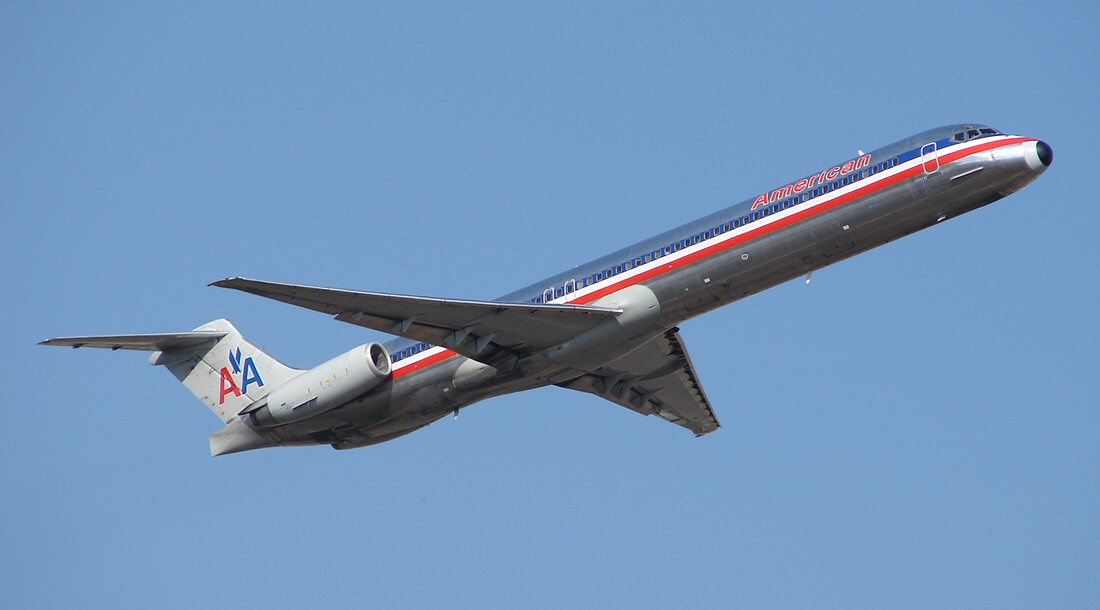
MD-80

In 1977, the next generation of DC-9 variants, dubbed the "Super 80" (later renamed the MD-80) series, was launched.

In 1977, the KC-10 Extender became the second McDonnell Douglas transport aircraft to be purchased by the U.S. Air Force, after the C-9 Nightingale/Skytrain II.

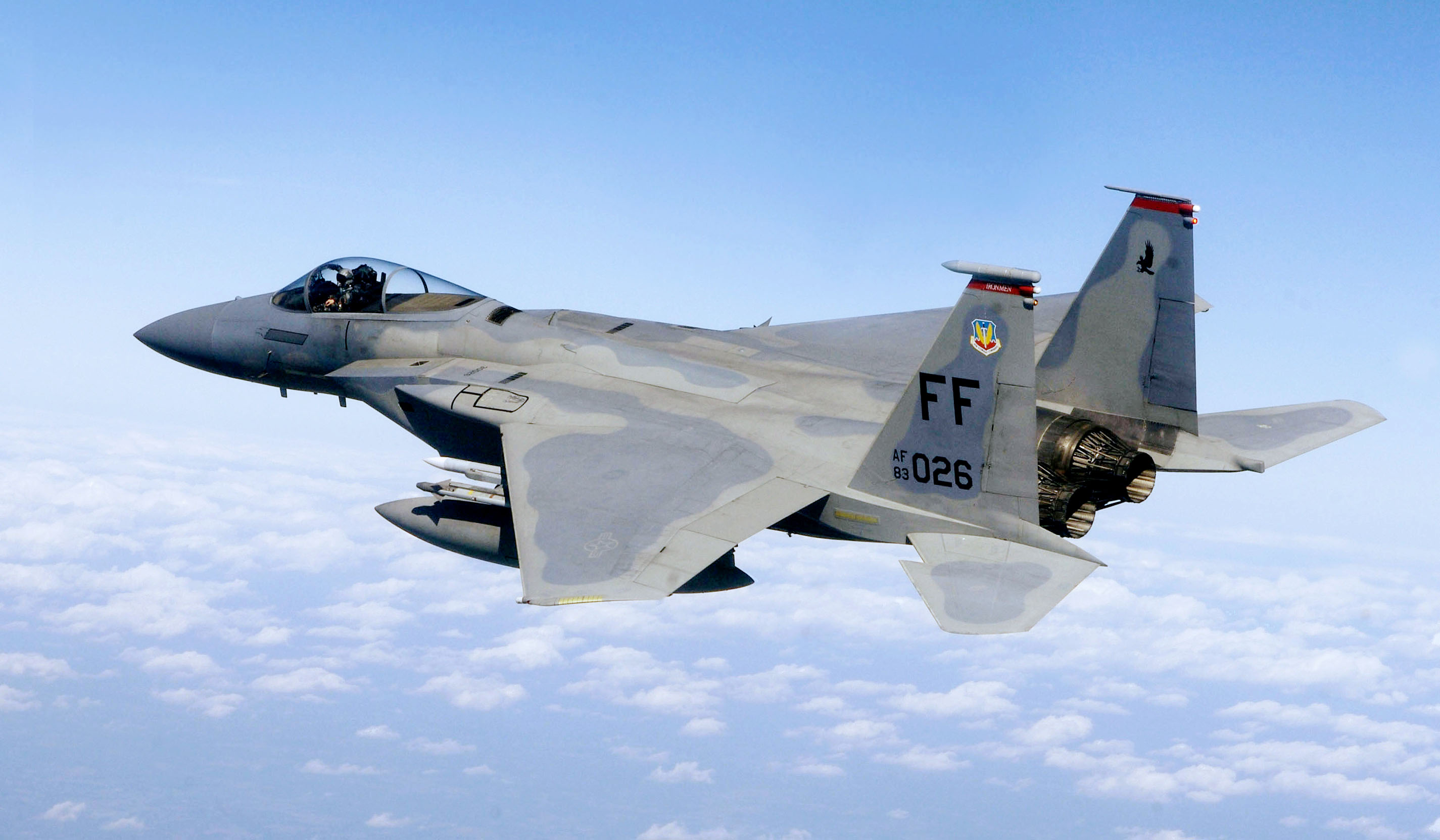
USAF F-15C during an Operation Noble Eagle patrol

Through the Cold War, McDonnell Douglas had introduced and manufactured dozens of successful military aircraft, including the F-15 Eagle in 1974 and the F/A-18 Hornet in 1978, as well as other products such as the Harpoon and Tomahawk missiles.

The oil crisis of the 1970s was a serious shock to the commercial aviation industry. McDonnell Douglas was hit by the economic shift and forced to contract while diversifying into new areas to protect against more downturns.

=== 1980–1989 ===
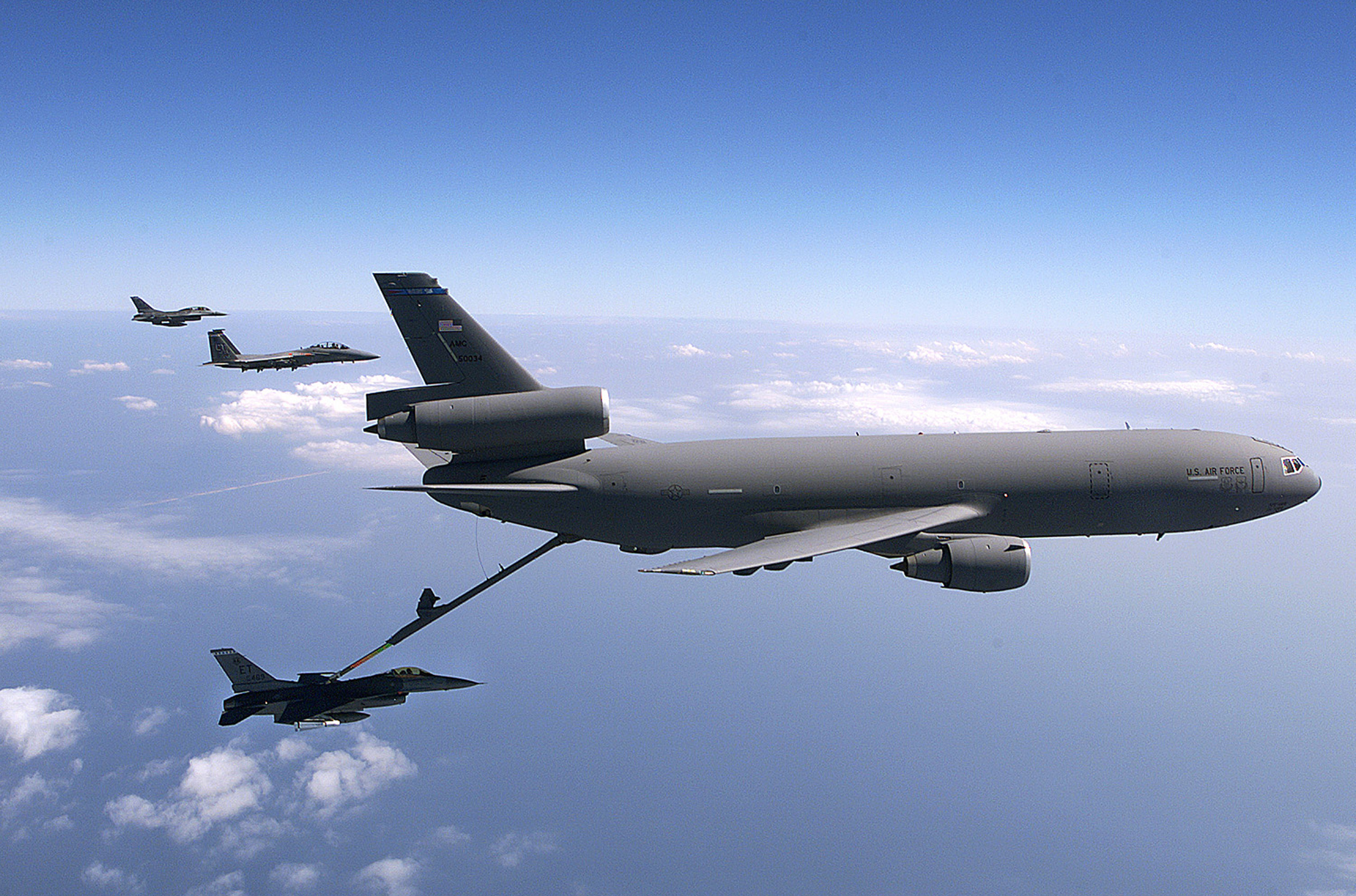
KC-10 Extender during refueling

In 1984, McDonnell Douglas expanded into helicopters by purchasing Hughes Helicopters from the Summa Corporation for $470 million. Hughes Helicopters was made a subsidiary initially and renamed McDonnell Douglas Helicopter Systems in August 1984. McDonnell Douglas Helicopters's most successful product was the Hughes-designed AH-64 Apache attack helicopter.

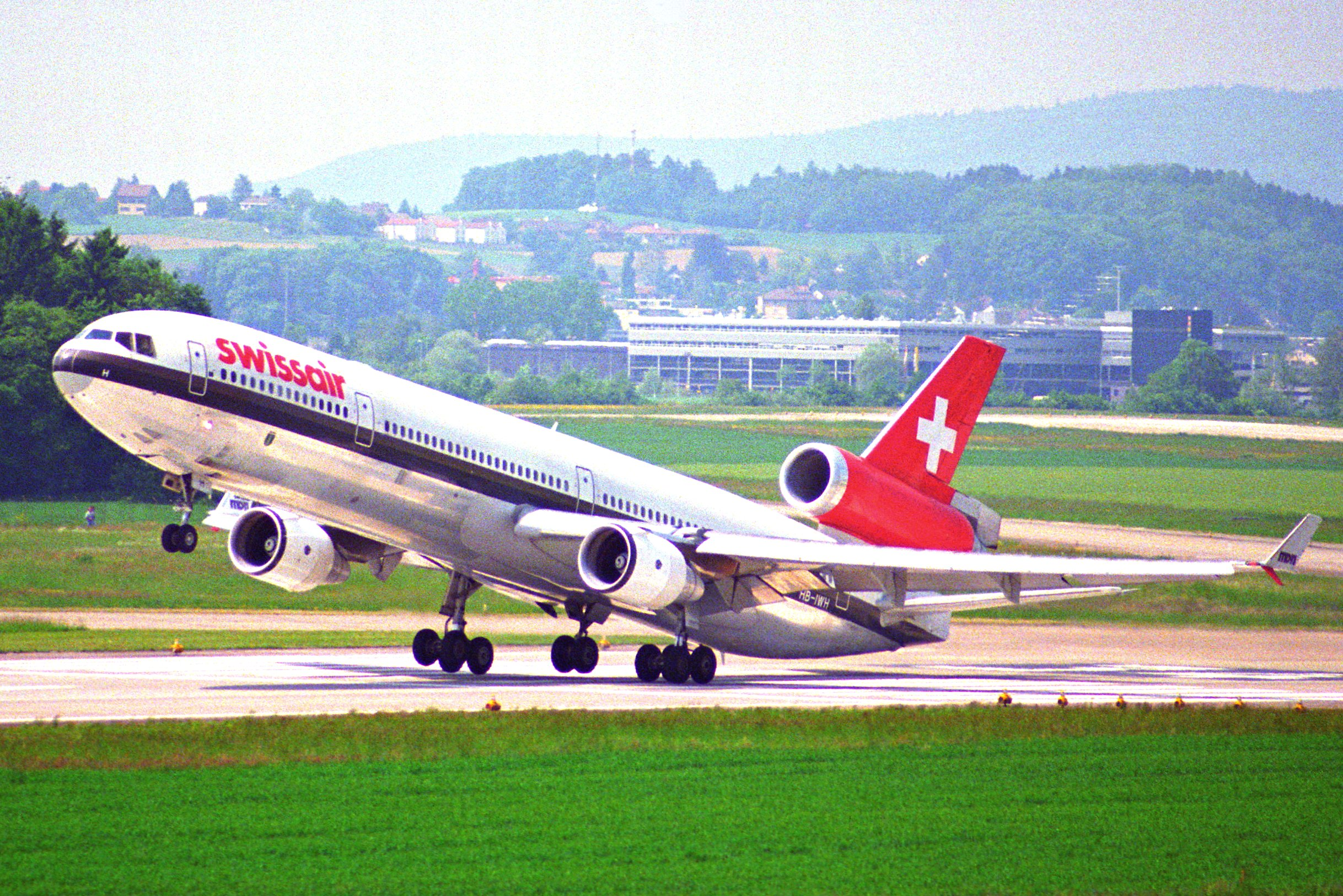
McDonnell Douglas MD-11

In 1986, the MD-11 was introduced, an improved and upgraded version of the DC-10. The MD-11 was the most advanced trijet aircraft to be developed. Since 1990 it sold 200 units, but was discontinued in 2001 after the merger with Boeing as it competed with the Boeing 777. The final commercial aircraft design to be produced by McDonnell Douglas came in 1988. The MD-90 was a stretched version of the MD-80, powered by International Aero Engines V2500 turbofans, the largest rear-mounted engines ever used on a commercial jet. The MD-95, a modern regional airliner closely resembling the DC-9-30, was the last McDonnell Douglas designed commercial jet to be produced.

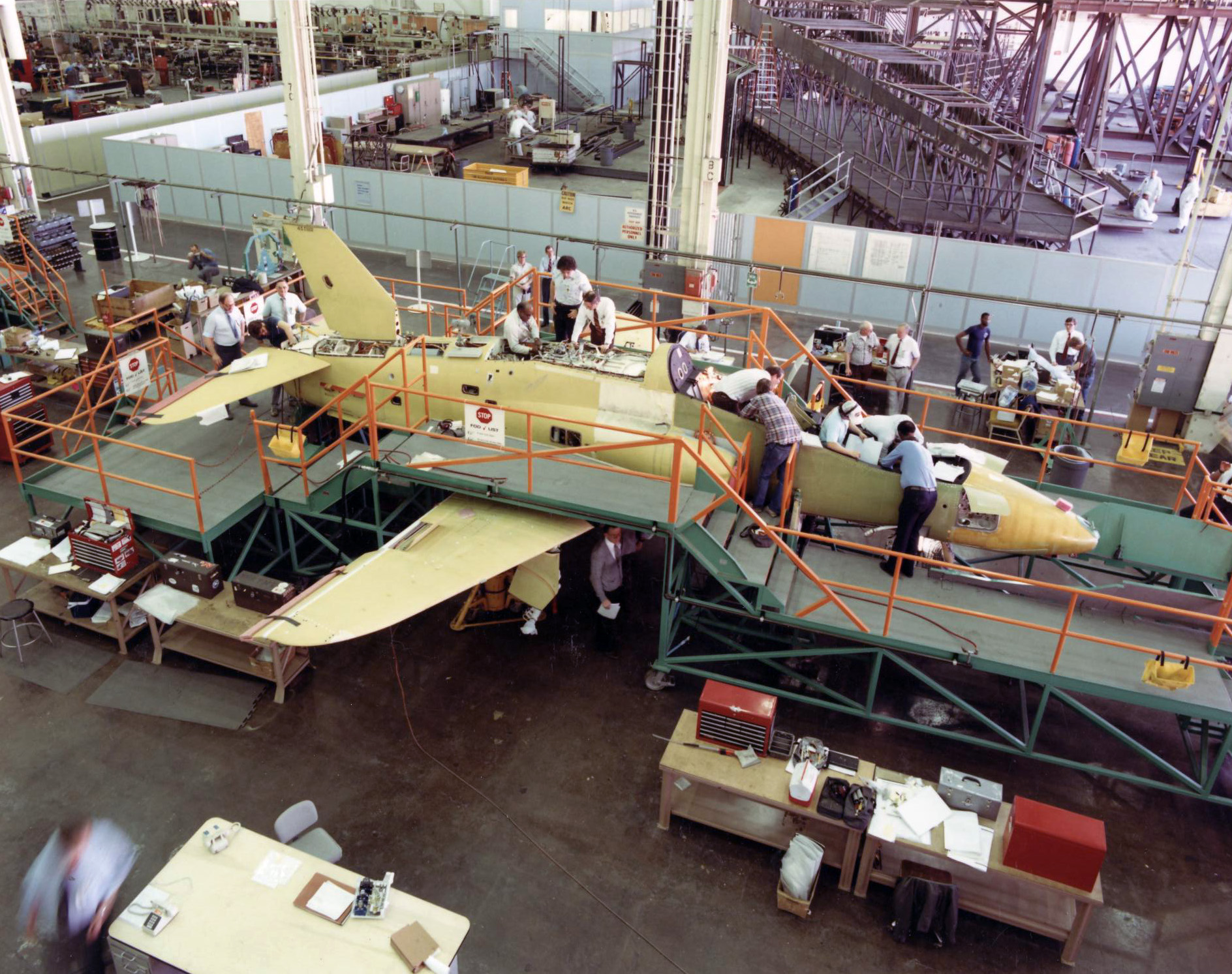
McDonnell Douglas T-45 Goshawk assembly line, c. 1988

On January 13, 1988, McDonnell Douglas and General Dynamics won the US Navy Advanced Tactical Aircraft (ATA) contract. The US$4.83 billion contract was to develop the A-12 Avenger II, a stealth, carrier-based, long-range flying wing attack aircraft that would replace the A-6 Intruder.

In January 1989, Robert Hood, Jr was appointed president to lead the Douglas Aircraft Division, replacing retiring President Jim Worsham. McDonnell Douglas then introduced a major reorganization called the Total Quality Management System (TQMS). TQMS ended the functional setup where engineers with specific expertise in aerodynamics, structural mechanics, materials, and other technical areas worked on several different aircraft. This was replaced by a product-oriented system where they focus on one specific airplane. As part of reorganization, 5,000 managerial and supervisory positions were eliminated at Douglas. The former managers could apply for 2,800 newly created posts; the remaining 2,200 would lose their managerial responsibilities. The reorganization reportedly led to widespread loss of morale at the company and TQMS was nicknamed "Time to Quit and Move to Seattle" by employees referring to the competitor Boeing headquartered in Seattle, Washington.

=== 1990–1997 ===
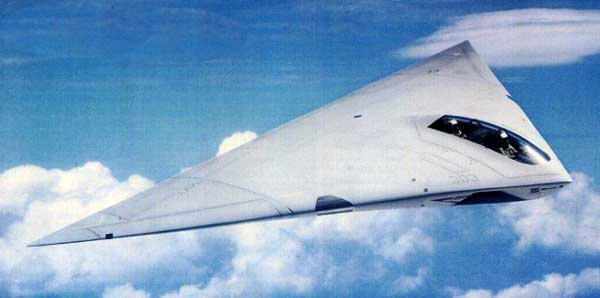
An artist's impression of the McDonnell Douglas/General Dynamics A-12 Avenger II aircraft. It was planned for the U.S. Navy but canceled in 1991 due to high cost.

Technical issues, development cost overruns, growing unit costs, and delays led to the termination of the A-12 Avenger II program on January 13, 1991, by Defense Secretary Dick Cheney. Years of litigation would proceed over the contract's termination: the government claimed that the contractors had defaulted on the contract and were not entitled to the final progress payments, while McDonnell Douglas and General Dynamics believed that the contract was terminated out of convenience, and thus the money was owed. The case was contested through litigation until a settlement was reached in January 2014. The chaos and financial stress created by the collapse of the A-12 program led to the layoff of 5,600 employees. The advanced tactical aircraft role vacated by the A-12 debacle would be filled by another McDonnell Douglas program, the F/A-18E/F Super Hornet.

However the purchasing of aircraft was curtailed as the Cold War came to an abrupt end in the 1990s. This curtailment in military procurements combined with the loss of the contracts for two major projects, the Advanced Tactical Fighter and Joint Strike Fighter, severely hurt McDonnell Douglas. McDonnell Douglas built only a small wind tunnel test model. At its peak in mid-1990, McDonnell Douglas employed 132,500 people, but dropped to about 87,400 by the end of 1992.

In 1991, the MD-11 was not quite a success; ongoing tests of the MD-11 revealed a significant shortfall in the aircraft's performance. An important prospective carrier, Singapore Airlines, required a fully laden aircraft capable of flying from Singapore to Paris, against strong headwinds during mid-winter; the MD-11 did not have sufficient range for this at the time. Due to the less-than-expected performance figures, Singapore Airlines canceled its order for 20 MD-11s on August 2, 1991, and ordered 20 Airbus A340-300s instead.

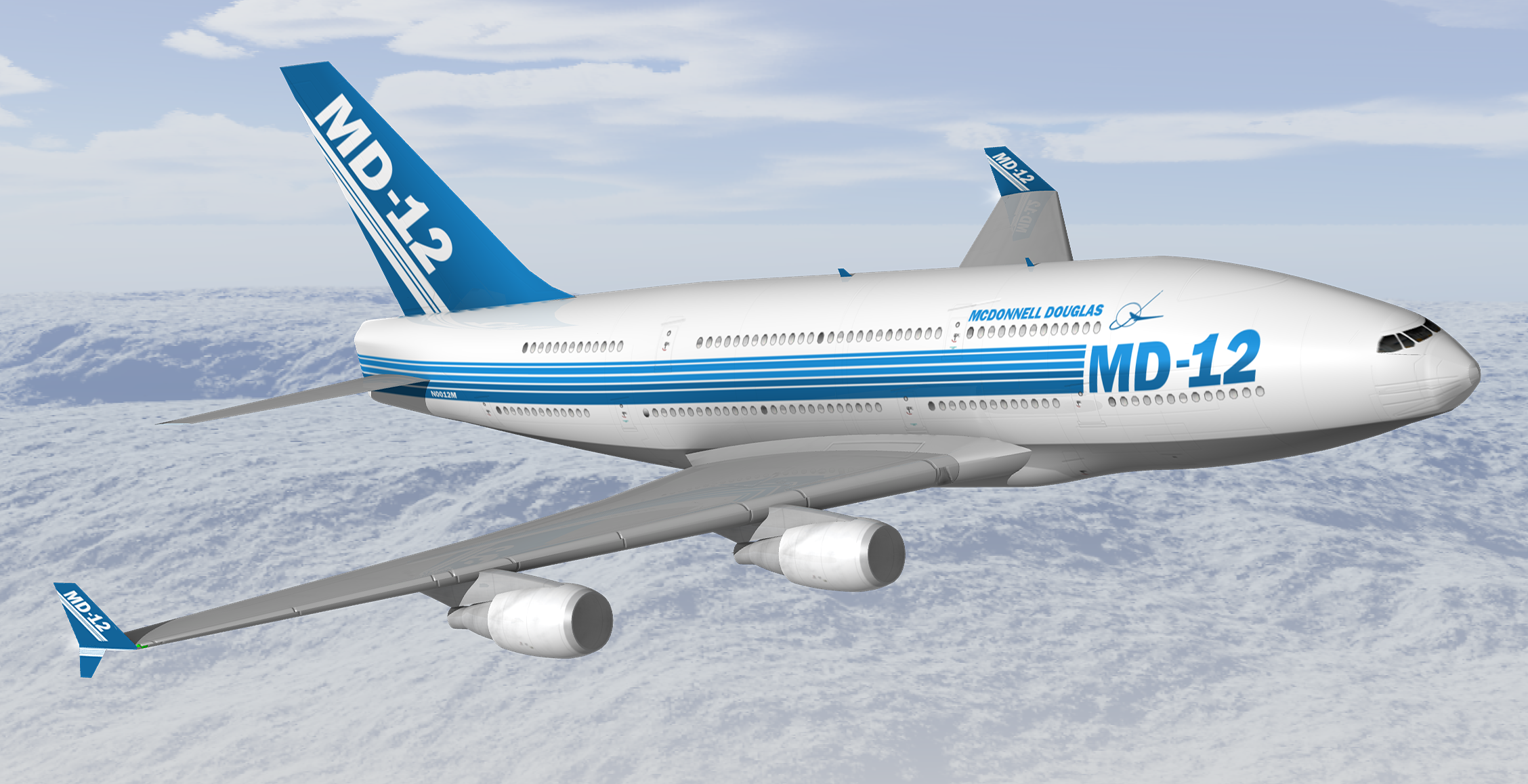
McDonnell Douglas MD-12 aircraft concept

In 1992, McDonnell Douglas unveiled a study of a double deck jumbo-sized aircraft designated MD-12. This study was perceived as merely a public relations exercise to disguise the fact that MDC was struggling under intense pressure from Boeing and Airbus. It was clear to most in the industry that MDC had neither the resources nor the money to develop such a large aircraft, and the study quickly sank without a trace. A similar double deck concept was used in Boeing's later Ultra-Large Aircraft study intended to replace the 747, but ultimately the double deck concept would not see the light of day until the Airbus A380 in the 2000s.

Following Boeing's 1996 acquisition of Rockwell's North American division, McDonnell Douglas merged with Boeing in August 1997 in a US$13 billion stock swap, with the latter as the surviving company. Boeing introduced a new corporate identity based on the McDonnell Douglas logo, which showed the globe being encircled in tribute to the first aerial circumnavigation which was accomplished in 1924 by Douglas aircraft. It was designed by graphic designer Rick Eiber, who had been the corporate identity consultant for Boeing over ten years.

Between 1993 and just after the merger in 1997, McDonnell Douglas performed studies on the feasibility of a twin-engine jet using MD-11 components, and ultimately made a pitch for such a jet with Boeing wings, but nothing came of any of the proposals.

In 1999, Boeing completed the spin off of the civilian line of helicopters to form MD Helicopters, which was formerly part of McDonnell Douglas Helicopter Systems.

Starting August 17, 2006, Boeing closed down the Long Beach factory as orders for the C-17 ceased.

=== McDonnell Automation Company legacy ===
Some of the company's lasting legacies are non-aviation related. They are the computer systems and companies developed in the company's subsidiary McDonnell Automation Company (McAuto) which was created in the 1950s initially used for numerical control for production starting in 1958 and computer-aided design (CAD) starting in 1959. Its CAD program MicroGDS remains in use with the latest official version 11.5.1 issued in October 2023, with the software ending sales in January 2025.

By the 1970s, McAuto had 3,500 employees and $170 million worth of computer equipment. This made it one of the largest computer processors in the world during this era.

In 1981, McAuto acquired Bradford Systems and Administrative Services for $11.5 million and began processing medical claims. In 1983, two principals of Bradford who had to come work at McAuto—Joseph T. Lynaugh and Howard L. Waltman—formed the Sanus Corporation, a health maintenance organization that was a wholly owned subsidiary of McDonnell Douglas. In 1986, after McDonnell Douglas reduced its control, Sanus announced a partnership with St. Louis pharmacy chain Medicare-Glaser Corp. to form Express Scripts to provide drugs for the Sanus HMO.

== Products ==
=== Military airplanes ===
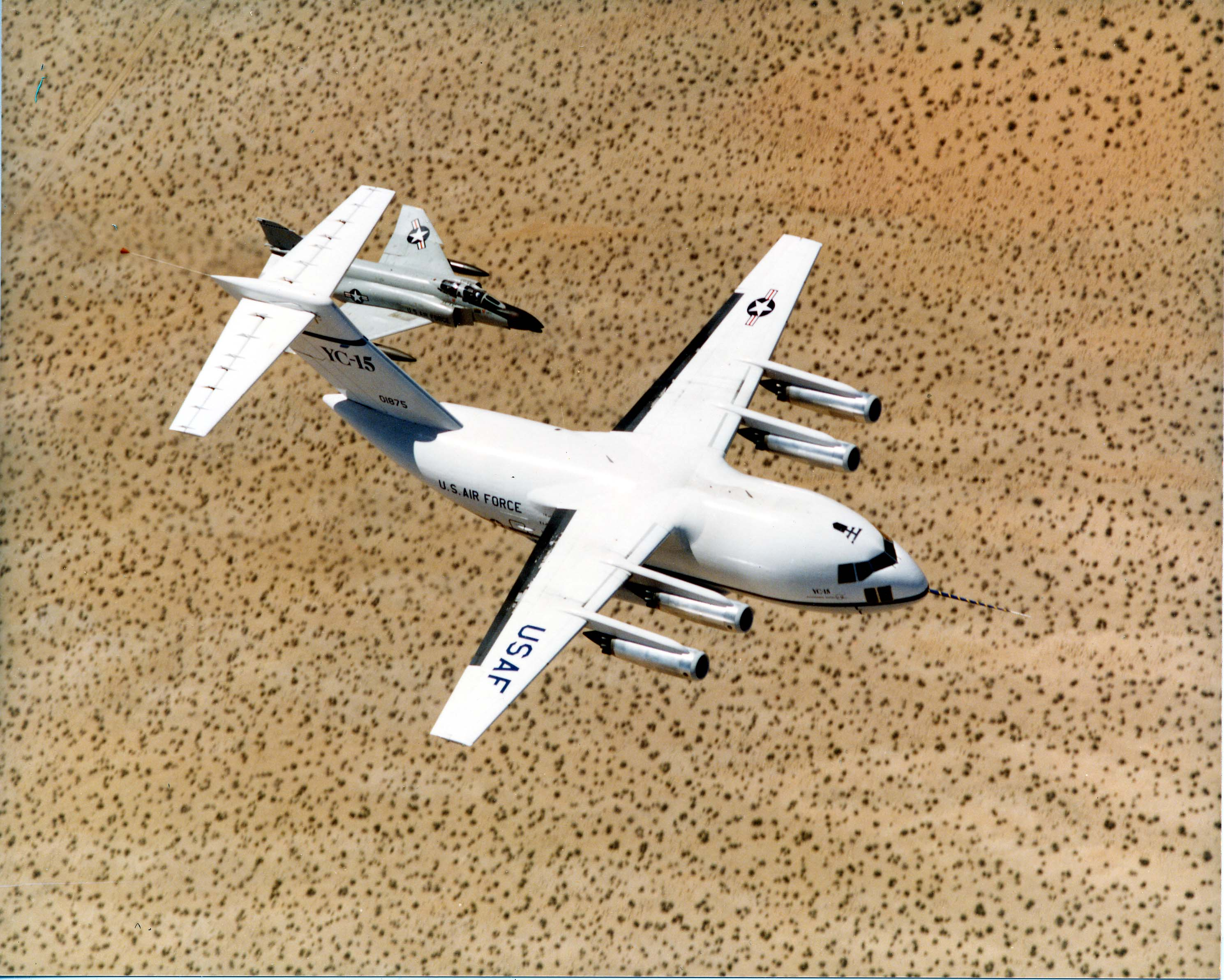
The McDonnell Douglas YC-15 was used as the base for the C-17.

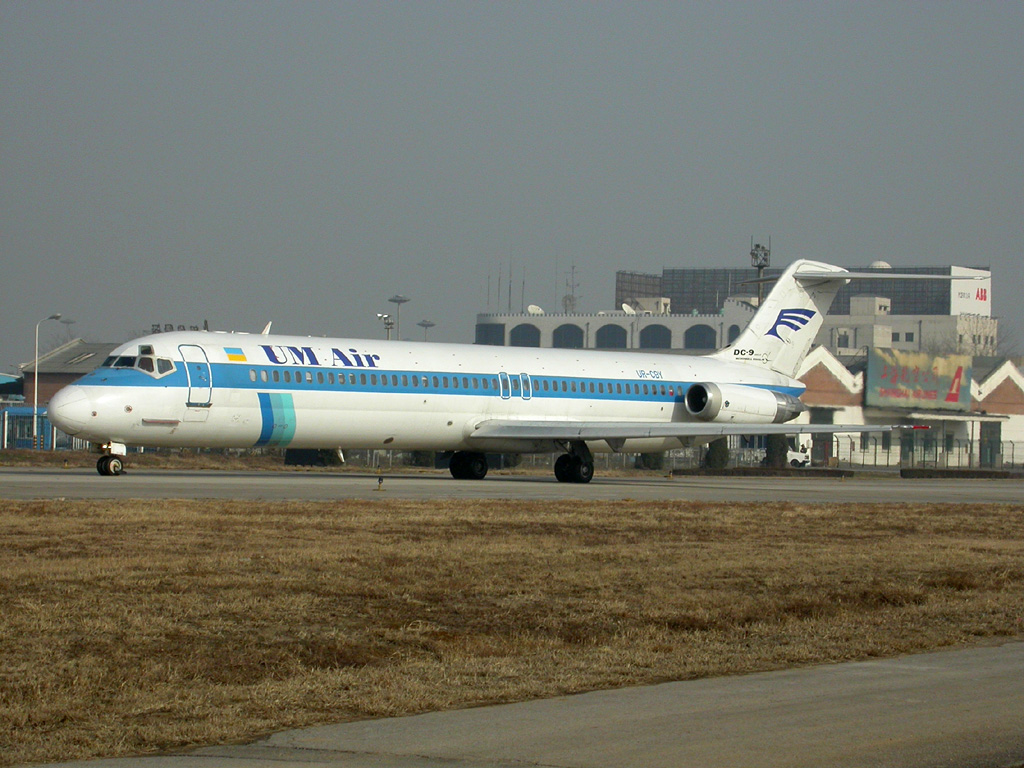
McDonnell Douglas DC-9

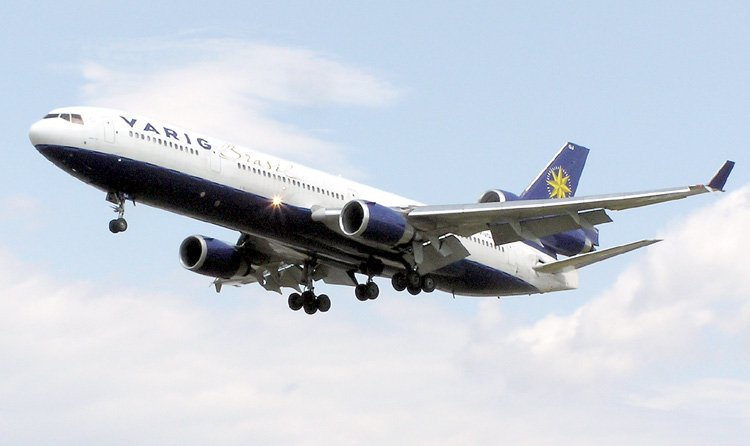
Built from 1988 to 2000, the MD-11 was the last McDonnell Douglas widebody aircraft.

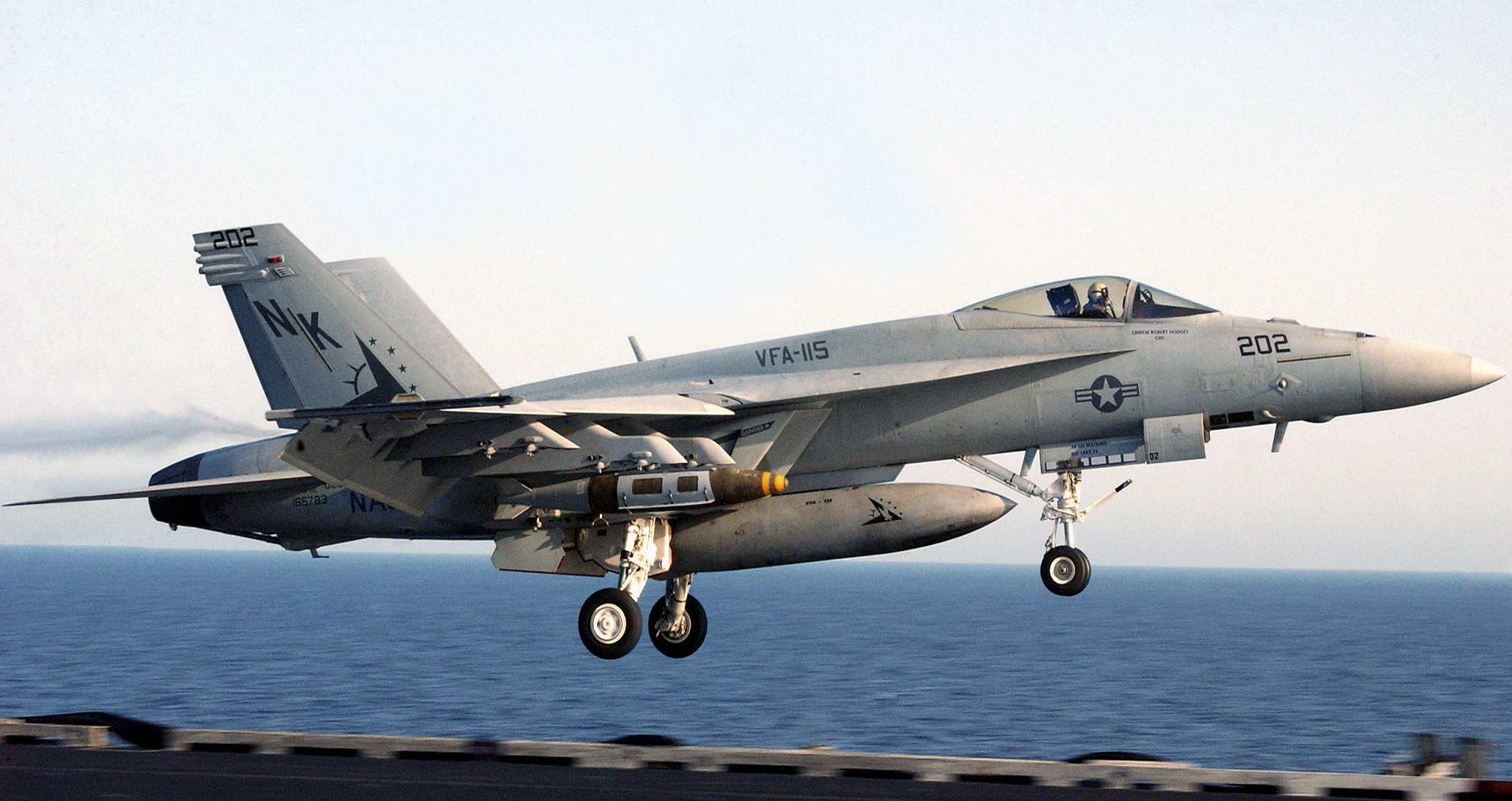
F/A-18E Super Hornet

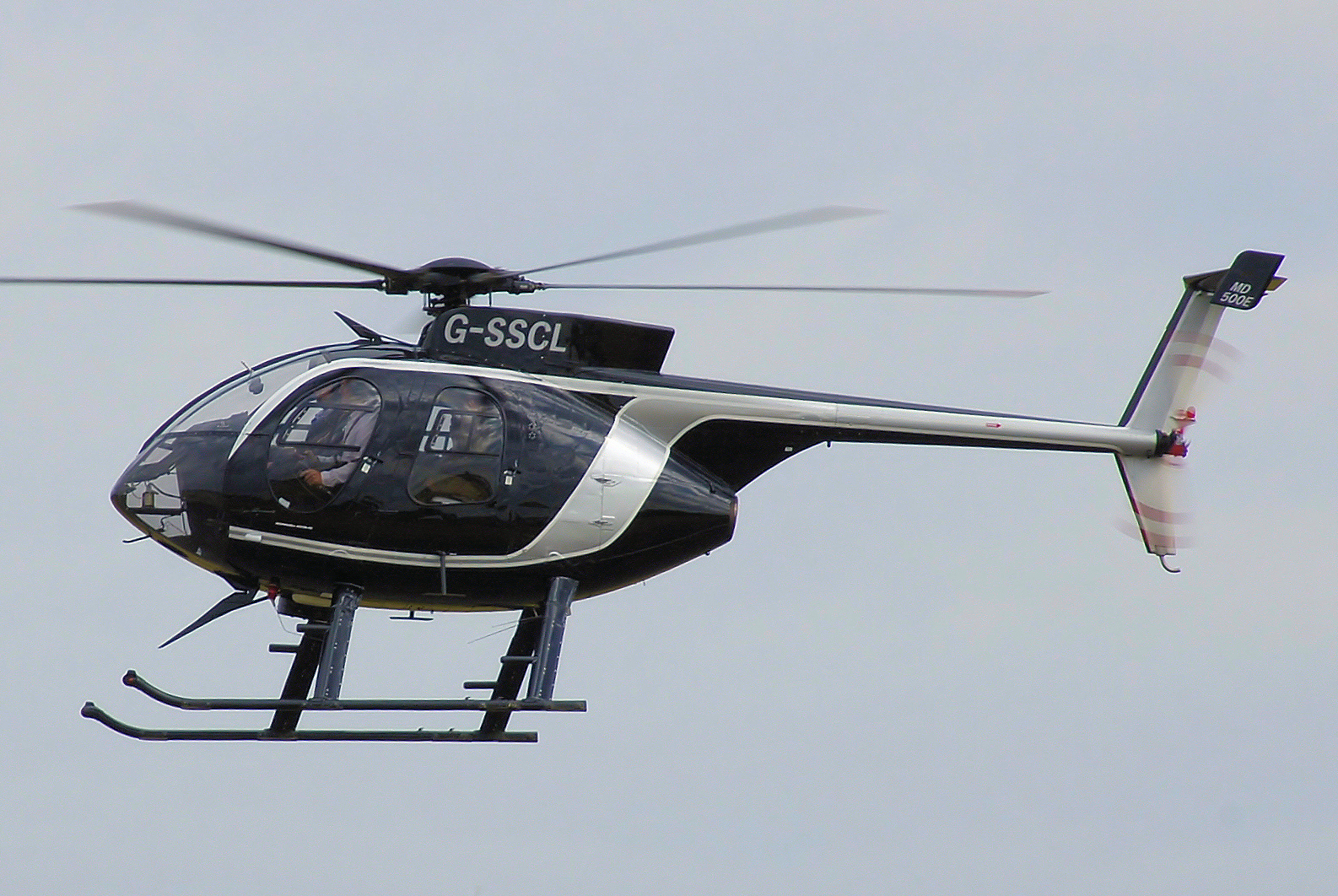
MD 500 Helicopter

- McDonnell Douglas A-4 Skyhawk (started under Douglas Aircraft, used by the Blue Angels)
  - McDonnell Douglas A-4G Skyhawk
  - Project Kahu
- McDonnell Douglas F-4 Phantom II (started under McDonnell Aircraft, used by the Blue Angels and Thunderbirds)
  - List of McDonnell Douglas F-4 Phantom II variants
- McDonnell Douglas C-9
- McDonnell Douglas F-15 Eagle
  - McDonnell Douglas F-15E Strike Eagle
  - McDonnell Douglas F-15 STOL/MTD
- McDonnell Douglas AV-8B Harrier II (based on the British Aerospace Harrier)
- McDonnell Douglas F/A-18 Hornet (used by the Blue Angels)
  - McDonnell Douglas CF-18 Hornet
  - High Alpha Research Vehicle
- McDonnell Douglas YC-15
- McDonnell Douglas T-45 Goshawk jet trainer (based on the British Aerospace Hawk)
- McDonnell Douglas KC-10 Extender
- McDonnell Douglas C-17 Globemaster III (Design and early production)
- McDonnell Douglas A-12 Avenger II with General Dynamics
- F/A-18E/F Super Hornet (Initial design and early production)

=== Commercial airplanes ===
- McDonnell Douglas DC-8 (started under Douglas Aircraft)
- McDonnell Douglas DC-9 (started under Douglas Aircraft)
- McDonnell Douglas DC-10 (with cockpit upgrade designated MD-10)
  - McDonnell Douglas KC-10 Extender
  - DC-10 Air Tanker
- McDonnell Douglas MD-11 (stretched and modernized version of the DC-10)
- McDonnell Douglas MD-80 (stretched and modernized version of the DC-9)
- McDonnell Douglas MD-90 (stretched and modernized version of the MD-80)
- MD-95 (latest evolution of the DC-9, sold as Boeing 717)

=== Experimental aircraft ===
- McDonnell Douglas X-36
- Bird of Prey

=== Proposed airliners ===
- McDonnell Douglas DC-10 Twin
- McDonnell Douglas DC-X-200
- McDonnell Douglas MD-12, a double-decker airplane similar to the Airbus A380 and Boeing NLA.
- McDonnell Douglas MD-94X

=== Helicopters ===
- AH-64 Apache (started under Hughes Helicopters)
- MD 500 series (started under Hughes Helicopters)
- MD 600
- MD 901/902/902 Explorer

=== Spacecraft ===
- Barbarian
- Big Gemini
- Skylab space station
- Skylab B

=== Computer systems ===
McDonnell Douglas acquired Microdata Corporation in 1983. The division was spun out as a separate company, McDonnell Douglas Information Systems in 1993.

- Sequel
- Spirit
- Reality OS
- Series 18 Model 6
- Series 18 Model 9
- Sovereign
- 6200
- 6400
- 7000
- 9000
- 9200
- 9400

The corporation also produced the Sovereign (later M7000) series of systems in the UK, which used the Sovereign operating system developed in the UK and which was not based on Pick, unlike the "Reality" family of systems listed above. Sovereign, largely a Data Entry solution, had a reasonable market in the United States supporting data entry shops.

=== Missiles and rockets ===
- BGM-109 Tomahawk missile
- Harpoon missile
- LIM-49 Spartan
- M47 Dragon
- Delta II rocket
- Saturn S-IV second stage
- Saturn S-IVB third stage
- McDonnell Douglas DC-X reusable rocket

== Commercial deliveries ==
Delivery of McDonnell Douglas-designed commercial airplanes by year and model
	DC-8	DC-9	DC-10	MD-80	MD-90	MD-11	Total
1959	21						21
1960	91						91
1961	42						42
1962	22						22
1963	19						19
1964	20						20
1965	31	5					36
1966	32	69					101
1967	41	153					194
1968	102	202					304
1969	85	122					207
1970	33	51					84
1971	13	46	13				72
1972	4	32	52				88
1973		29	57				86
1974		48	47				95
1975		42	43				85
1976		50	19				69
1977		22	14				36
1978		22	18				40
1979		39	35				74
1980		18	41	5			64
1981		16	25	61			102
1982		10	11	34			55
1983			12	51			63
1984			10	44			54
1985			11	71			82
1986			17	85			102
1987			10	94			104
1988			10	120			130
1989			1	117			118
1990				139		3	142
1991				140		31	171
1992				84		42	126
1993				43		36	79
1994				23		17	40
1995				18	13	18	49
1996				12	25	15	52
1997				16	26	12	54
1998				8	34	12	54
1999				26	13	8	47
2000					5	4	9
2001						2	2
Total	556	976	446	1,191	116	200	3,485
Active	1	15-30	8-10	~100	0	~20	676
	DC-8	DC-9	DC-10	MD-80	MD-90	MD-11	

== Leadership ==
=== President ===
- David Sloan Lewis Jr., 1967–1970
- James Smith McDonnell III, 1970–1971
- Sanford Noyes McDonnell, 1971–1980
- John Finney McDonnell, 1980–1988
- Gerald Andrew Johnston, 1988–1994
- Harrison Curtis Stonecipher, 1994–1997

=== Chairman of the Board ===
- James Smith McDonnell Jr., 1967–1980
- Sanford Noyes McDonnell, 1980–1988
- John Finney McDonnell, 1988–1997

== Bibliography ==
- Yenne, Bill. McDonnell Douglas. Crescent Books, 1985. ISBN 0-517-44287-6.
- Norris, Guy; Wagner, Mark (2001). Airbus A340 and A330. Osceola. p. 120. ISBN 0760308896.
- Norris, Guy; Wagner, Mark (1999). Douglas Jetliners. Osceola. p. 96. ISBN 0760306761.
