= Rocket Software =

Software company

Rocket Software Inc.
- Type: Private
- Industry: Computer software
- Founded: 1990
- Headquarters: Waltham, Massachusetts, United States
- Number of locations: 22 offices
- Area served: Worldwide
- Key people: Milan Shetti (President and CEO)
- Number of employees: 3,000+
- Website: www.rocketsoftware.com

Rocket Software is a privately held software development company founded in 1990 and headquartered in Waltham, Massachusetts, USA. The company specializes in enterprise software that allows organizations to modernize critical IT infrastructure across on-premises, hybrid, and cloud environments. This includes products that support core systems, including IBM Z, IBM i, distributed, and cloud platforms, enabling organizations to integrate legacy and modern applications, optimize data management, and improve operational efficiency. Rocket operates in markets including the financial, banking, health care, government, insurance, aerospace, auto manufacturing, and retail industries.

Rocket has a historic business partnership with IBM that began in 1994 with a licensing agreement for Rocket QMF tools. Since 2018, Bain Capital has owned a majority stake in the company.

== History ==
Rocket Software was founded in Boston in 1990 by Andy Youniss and Johan Magnusson Gedda with a focus on IBM DB2 tools. Over the next three decades, the company grew both organically and through dozens of acquisitions, including Zephyr, Shadow, Aldon, and D3.

In 2018, Bain Capital acquired a majority stake in the company in a deal that valued Rocket Software at nearly $2 billion. Since then, the company has continued to grow through a number of acquisitions.

In 2021, Rocket acquired ASG Technologies, an enterprise information management and IT System Management Solutions Software provider. That same year Rocket acquired the database and tools products of Zumasys including jBASE MultiValue DB and Netherlands-based development platform Uniface.

In November 2021, Milan Shetti was named CEO, replacing co-founder and longtime CEO Andy Youniss.

In June 2022, Rocket released the latest version of its ASG-Enterprise Orchestrator (AEO) DevOps value stream orchestration platform. In September 2022, Rocket acquired BOS, a German developer of data integration tools. The unit was renamed Rocket Data Replicate and Sync.

In 2023, Rocket acquired Key Resources, which specializes in mainframe security and vulnerability identification and assessment. In November 2023, Rocket agreed to buy OpenText’s Application Modernization and Connectivity (AMC) business for $2.28 billion in cash. Under the agreement, AMC’s software, associated services and about 750 employees were integrated into Rocket Software. The deal, which was completed in May 2024, increased Rocket Software’s revenue by 60% and grew its customer base to greater than 12,500 companies.

In 2026, Rocket Software completed its $150 million acquisition of Vertica from OpenText. The deal added Vertica’s analytics database platform, 600 customers, and 170 employees, expanding Rocket's modernization portfolio with analytics, data warehousing, and AI capabilities across cloud, on-premises, and hybrid environments.

== Products ==
Rocket Software develops software products focused on IT modernization across on-premises and hybrid cloud environments. The company’s offerings span data integration, application modernization, security and compliance, hybrid cloud connectivity, and workflow automation.

Rocket Software’s solutions are used across industries, including financial services, insurance, healthcare, manufacturing, retail, and government, with an emphasis on organizations that rely on critical infrastructure such as IBM Z and IBM i systems.

=== Rocket EVA ===
In January 2026, Rocket Software released Rocket EVA, an AI-powered, agentic platform for operational diagnostics across core systems, including the mainframe. Rocket EVA enables IT operators and developers to query monitoring, analytics, and knowledge sources using natural language. Its proprietary Automatic Context Engineering (ACE) layer integrates customer knowledge assets, context refinement rules, and chain of thought prompts to identify and diagnose operational issues, understand their underlying causes, and support decision-making in seconds, without requiring application migration or code rewrites.

=== Data Modernization ===
Rocket DataEdge is a suite of data integration tools designed to connect transactional, distributed, and cloud systems through enterprise-wide data discovery, access, and management. It enables the creation of unified, high-quality data assets that support analytics and artificial intelligence initiatives.

=== Secure Host Access ===
Rocket Secure Host Access provides enterprise terminal emulation software with a focus on security and integration with identity and access management (IAM) systems. It supports compliance with standards such as HIPAA, DORA, and PCI-DSS, and includes encryption technologies such as TLS 1.3 and SSH. Introduced in 2025, the platform is designed to provide centralized, secure access to mainframe, IBM i, and virtual terminal (VT) systems through desktop and browser-based interfaces, integrating green-screen login authentication with Identity and Access Management solutions to extend modern security practices, such as MFA and SSO, to terminal emulation. The product is available in three tiers:

- Rocket Secure Host Access Pro provides desktop-based host application access with advanced encryption;
- Rocket Secure Host Access Enterprise implements an additional security layer, allowing integration with corporate IAM systems, multi-factor authentication (MFA), and single sign-on (SSO);
- Rocket Secure Host Access Anywhere offers both desktop and web-based access with extended security controls.

A 2025 Forrester Research Total Economic Impact (TEI) Study, commissioned by Rocket Software, reported that organizations using Secure Host Access achieved measurable improvements in productivity and security, including a 30% improvement in overall security posture, a 50% increase in mainframe IT team productivity, and an estimated $921,000 in help desk savings over three years.

Introduced in 2025, the platform consolidated several existing Rocket Software products, including Rocket Host Access Management and Security Server (MSS), Rocket Reflection Desktop, and Rocket Host Access for the Cloud, under the Rocket Secure Host Access name.

=== COBOL Solutions ===
Rocket COBOL products provide tools for modernizing COBOL-based applications while maintaining existing business logic. They support integration with development environments such as Eclipse, Visual Studio, and Visual Studio Code, and enable deployment across distributed, containerized, and multicloud platforms. The solutions include features for automated testing, continuous integration and deployment (CI/CD), and GenAI-assisted development to accelerate onboarding and code modernization. They also provide interoperability with Java and .NET environments, allowing COBOL applications to be extended through APIs, microservices, and contemporary IT architectures.

== Reception ==
Since 2013 when the list was inaugurated, Rocket was included in Database Trends and Applications magazine's annual “DBTA 100,” a list of the companies that matter most in data.

In 2017, former Rocket CEO Andy Youniss was named a New England Entrepreneur of the Year by professional services firm EY. Youniss was also presented the Leadership Award by Boston-based food rescue nonprofit Lovin' Spoonfuls in November 2017.

In December 2017, Rocket was named Ellucian Growth Partner of the Year for providing support to the higher education IT services company in its transition to its current cloud-based service offerings and SaaS licensing model.

In 2020, Rocket was named in Inc.'s list of America's 1,000 Largest and Most Inspiring Private Companies.

In 2023, Rocket Software received a Bronze Merit Award for Technology in the Software and Apps category. Rocket Software was also named Insider Threat Detection Platform of the Year at the 2023 CyberSecurity Breakthrough Awards.

In 2024, Rocket was honored with an Intellyx Digital Innovator Award. Also in 2024, Rocket Software was recognized in DBTA’s list of Top 100 Companies That Matter Most in Data.

In 2025, the company was named a Challenger in the Gartner, Inc. Magic Quadrant for Service Orchestration and Automation Platforms (SOAP) for the second consecutive year, acknowledging its work in bringing workload automation across on-premises, distributed, and cloud environments. In 2026, Rocket Software was also named a Challenger in the Gartner Magic Quadrant for Technical Debt Management Tools for its portfolio, including Rocket Enterprise Analyzer, Rocket COBOL Analyzer, Rocket TMON One, and more. In 2026, Gartner also named Rocket Software a Challenger in its Magic Quadrant for AI-Augmented Code Modernization Tools. Rocket Software’s application modernization products use AI-assisted analysis, business-rule extraction, automated testing, and validation to support the assessment, transformation and modernization of COBOL and PL/I applications across mainframe, distributed, and cloud environments, while preserving business logic and operational continuity.

Rocket Software’s data integration product Rocket DataEdge was honored by the Tearsheet Data Awards in the Data Innovation category for its ability to unlock data trapped in mainframe systems and enable cloud-capable analytics workflows, without compromising continuity or security.

Rocket Software has also been recognized as a top place to work, being named one of America’s Greatest Workplaces for Mental Well-Being in 2025 and 2026 by Newsweek and one of the 2025 – 2026 Best Companies to Work For by U.S. News & World Report.
