= Microdata Corporation =

Minicomputer company in America

- Industry: Computers
- Headquarters: Irvine, California, US
- Products: Microdata hardware

Microdata Corporation was an American minicomputer company which created the Reality product line featuring the Pick operating system.

In its history, Microdata

- was taken over by its international distributor CMC Leasings (December 1969),
- which in turn was taken over in 1983 by McDonnell Douglas Corporation (March 1983),
- that division was spun off as McDonnell Douglas Information Systems (1993)
- which became part of Northgate Information Solutions (April 2000).
- which was acquired by NEC in 2018 and rebranded to NEC Software Solutions UK in 2021.

The company was initially formed as a hardware company.

Independently, TRW, in fulfillment of a mid-1960s US government contract to build software to track inventory, developed a database system named Generalized Information Retrieval Language System (GIRLS). As a public domain item, a developer named Richard Pick was free to use it as the basis of a subsequent work, which eventually became the Pick operating system. The initial version was designed to work on hardware produced by Microdata, which introduced the combination under the name Reality in 1974.

Since the software part of Reality was based on public domain work, Pick considered himself free to develop versions for other systems. A lawsuit followed: the ruling was that both Microdata and Pick could each consider themselves owners of the software.

McDonnell Douglas bought Microdata but eventually sold it off. Meanwhile, Pick revised his software to make it more portable, resulting in many systems able to run what now was called the Pick Operating System.

Many implementations followed: Prime Computer's Prime INFORMATION was done as far back as 1979 as a combination of FORTRAN and Assembler.

== Media appearances ==
Microdata's headquarters building figures prominently briefly in Godfrey Reggio's 1983 film Koyaanisqatsi.

== ENGLISH (programming language) ==
One way of accessing data under some of the Pick implementations had a number of names:

- ENGLISH—The data retrieval language used to produce reports with English-like sentences.
- It was also called by other Pick and Pick-like implementations:

* RECALL (Ultimate)
* ACCESS (Pick Systems)
* INFO/ACCESS (PRIME Information)

== Microdata hardware ==
There were 3 computer models offered by Microdata:

- Microdata 800
- Microdata 1600
- Microdata 3200

The original machine was a Microdata 800, an 8-bit microprogrammed computer first made in 1969. This computer was licensed to the French company Intertechnique who sold it in Europe under the name Multi-8. It was particularly in use in nuclear power stations, research applications (such as crystallography and biology) and process control.

The Microdata 1600 was an updated version of the 800 processor (commercialized under the name Multi-4 by Intertechnique).

The original development of Reality was done on the Microdata 800. The first Reality system was based on the 1600 and was sold commercially in 1973. The unique feature of the early Microdata processors was that the microcode was accessible to the user and allowed the creation of custom assembler level instructions. The Reality system design made extensive use of this capability.

The Microdata 3200 was developed in 1974 and was a 16-bit microprogrammed system designed to implement a high level language similar to IBM's PL/I language. It was designed to a more specific purpose, but still retained a great deal of flexibility in the firmware to allow for very complex microprogrammed architectures to be supported.
