= Aristotle Metadata Registry =

- Screenshots of Aristotle Metadata Registry in desktop and mobile formats.
- Developer: Aristotle Metadata Community
- Release: v1.0-rc0 / 2015-05-28
- Stable release: v3.0.16 / 2020-01-16
- Written in: Python, Django, Vue.js
- Standards: ISO/IEC 11179, ISO/TC 215, DCAT & DDI
- Type: Metadata Registry
- License: Commercial software
- Website: www.aristotlemetadata.com
- Repository: github.com/aristotle-mdr/aristotle-metadata-registry

The Aristotle Metadata Registry is commercial Metadata Registry software based on the ISO/IEC 11179 standard for Metadata Registries. It is influenced by the AIHW METeOR Metadata Registry and the Canadian Institute of Health Information Indicator Bank. Aristotle-MDR is designed to describe data holdings databases and associated structural metadata. The Aristotle Metadata Registry was publicly launched at the 2015 IASSIST Conference in Toronto. In 2016, the founders of the Aristotle Metadata Registry were hired by Data61 (a division of CSIRO) to continue development of the platform.

== Commercial support ==
Commercial support for the Aristotle Metadata Registry is provided by Aristotle Cloud Services Australia (ACSA), a Canberra-based Australian limited liability company. ACSA was founded by the core members of the Data61 Aristotle Metadata team in November 2017 to provide commercial support to government clients and provides a number security and enterprise features within the Aristotle Cloud product line. Aristotle Cloud Services Australia is a member of both the Data Documentation Initiative and member of the Canberra start-up hub Entry29. Aristotle Cloud Services Australia was one of the major sponsors of the 2019 IASSIST conference.

In 2021, Aristotle Cloud Services Australia was a national finalist in the 59th Australian Export & Investment Awards.

== Current implementations ==
- DSS Metadata Registry - A metadata registry for the Department of Social Services (Australia) capturing data about longitudinal social security information.
- DSS Metadata Registry - A metadata registry for the Services Australia (Australia) capturing metadata about programs and schemes of department.
- FACSIAR Metadata Registry - A metadata registry for the New South Wales Department of Family and Community Services capturing information about child welfare, homelessness and out-of-home care outcomes.
- GRDC - A metadata registry for the Grain Research and Development Cooperation capturing information about the Australia's grains industry.
- Health Service Executive - A metadata registry for the Health Service Executive capturing information about health system in Ireland.
- Department of Education, Skills and Employment - A metadata registry for the Department of Education, Skills and Employment capturing information about education, skills and employment.
- Department of Employment and Workplace Relations - A metadata registry for the Department of Employment and Workplace Relations capturing information about employment policies and workplace programs.
- Beamtree - A metadata registry for the Beamtree capturing information about indicators related to health data.
- Workplace Gender Equality Indicator Registry - A metadata registry for the Workplace Gender Equality Agency recording Gender Equality indicators for Australian employers.
- Evolve SBR - Australian Government Standard Business Reporting Data Dictionary
- Metadata Online registry for Cloud Applications - A metadata registry operated by the Korea Information Technology Association that "helps applications ensure interoperability by using standard metadata to configure the database or issue APIs."
- OCASI Indicator Registry - Metadata registry for the Ontario Council of Agencies Serving Immigrants
- Prosper Canada Financial Literacy Indicator Registry - Registry of peer-reviewed indicators tracking financial literacy outcomes for Prosper Canada
- Metadata Online registry for Cloud Applications - A metadata registry operated by the Korea Information Technology Association that "helps applications ensure interoperability by using standard metadata to configure the database or issue APIs."
- World Health Organization "100 Core Health Indicators" - A registry for standard indicators, dashboards, data quality frameworks for the World Health Organization

== Extension API ==
Aristotle-MDR implements the object-oriented nature of ISO/IEC 11179 that has allowed the community to build extensions to the original metadata scope of ISO/IEC 11179. Current additional metadata types provided by the community include:

- Health indicator and Performance Indicator types to record population-level health and equality indicators such as those collected by the President's Emergency Plan for AIDS Relief and the World Health Organization
- A DCAT compatible extension to support Data set specifications to record columnar datasets
- Download formats for Data Documentation Initiative and DHIS

== Tabilon ==
Tabilon is a data request portal powered by Aristotle that provides a streamlined process for researchers to request data from different organizations and institutions. To use Tabilon, researchers create a data passport, which allows them to browse through the platform's metadata and select the data they need for their research. The data request is then sent to a data custodian for approval, who is responsible for managing the data on the platform and ensuring that it is shared and used in accordance with relevant regulations and policies. Tabilon enforces strict privacy policies to protect the personal information of researchers and data custodians, and ensures that data is encrypted and stored securely.
