= Nesstar =

Advanced data management program

Nesstar was a suite of data and metadata management software created in 2000 and maintained by the former Norwegian Social Science Data Services (also known as NSD) until its end-of-life in 2022. The Nesstar tool suite consisted of a Nesstar Repository, Nesstar WebView, a Nesstar Editor, and the Nesstar Explorer as the user interface.

Nesstar's goal was to facilitate data sharing, providing tools for the preparation, curation, and dissemination of research data and related research outputs. Nesstar tools were built explicitly to support the Data Documentation Initiative (DDI) metadata standard in the XML metadata format.

== History ==
The Nesstar project began in 1998 as a collaboration between the NSD, the UK Data Archive and the Danish Data Archive (DDA) of the Danish National Archives, and it was funded by the Fourth European Framework Programme for Research and Technological Development. It was originally described as a "seamlessly integrated data discovery, analysis and dissemination system based on Java, XML and the DDI".

Nesstar Publisher was beta-released in 1999 and its first full release was in January 2000. From 2001, the software was maintained by Nesstar Ltd., a wholly owned subsidiary of the UK Data Archive and the NSD, based at the University of Essex and the University of Bergen.

With the release of Nesstar 4.0 in 2015, Nesstar developers discontinued support for the software and designated Nesstar as end-of-life.

== Software tools ==
Nesstar Server and WebView were offered as licensed and software products in Linux and Windows, while Nesstar Publisher was released as Windows freeware only.

Nesstar Publisher was created as an advanced data management program for the preparation and enhancement of statistical data and metadata. It was designed to function alternatively as a standalone tool or as the front-end to a Nesstar Server repository back-end. Nesstar WebView provided a user interface through which users could search, browse, analyze and download the data published.

Nesstar features included metadata extraction from statistical software file formats (SPSS, NSDstat and Stata) and conversion of SPSS metadata into DDI XML.

== Reception ==
The Nesstar Project was an early player in the development of internet-supported research data management. The project also contributed to creating and maintaining the DDI metadata standard. As one of the earliest research data management tools developed specifically for social science research, Nesstar tools were adopted widely by the international community, and Nesstar-based repositories have included:

- The Canadian Odesi Repository
- The Centre for Socio-Political Data, Sciences Po
- The Czech Social Science Data Archive
- The European Social Survey data repository
- The World Bank's International Household Survey Network
- The Slovene Social Science Data Archives (ADP)
- Social Science Japan Data Archive (Center for Social Research and Data Archives, University of Tokyo)
- Statistics Canada
