= IASST =

IASST may refer to:

- International Association for Safety and Survival Training
- Institute of Advanced Study in Science and Technology, Guwahati, an autonomous institution under the Department of Science and Technology (India)

== See also ==
- IAST
- IASSIST
