= Data Documentation Initiative =

- Data Documentation Initiative Metadata Standard
- DDI
- Abbreviation: DDI
- Status: Production Use
- Year started: 1995
- First published: 2000
- Latest version: DDI-Codebook 2.6 DDI-Lifecycle 3.3 DDI-CDI 1.0
- Organization: DDI Alliance
- Committee: Technical Committee
- Related standards: ISO/PAS 25955:2026
- Domain: Questionnaires Metadata Standard Statistical survey Social sciences
- License: Creative Commons Attribution 4.0 International
- Website: ddialliance.org

The Data Documentation Initiative (DDI) is an international family of metadata standards for describing research data and supporting the management, exchange, long-term preservation, and reuse of associated metadata. DDI supports the FAIR principles of findability, accessibility, interoperability, and reusability by creating structured, machine-readable descriptions of research data.

Originally developed for the social, behavioral, and economic sciences, DDI supports the documentation of surveys, questionnaires, statistical data files, variables, and study-level information, as well as metadata associated with the broader research data lifecycle, including study design, data collection, processing, dissemination, and archiving. The standards are developed and maintained by the DDI Alliance, an international membership organization composed of research institutions, statistical agencies, data archives, and other organizations.

DDI comprises three principal specifications: DDI-Codebook, which supports the documentation of individual datasets; DDI-Lifecycle, which supports documenting research data and processes throughout the data lifecycle, and is appropriate for longitudinal, linked, and other complex datasets; and DDI Cross-Domain Integration (DDI-CDI), which supports the description and integration of data across scientific domains. The specifications use structured metadata to enable data discovery, interpretation, interoperability, and reuse.

== History ==
Development of DDI began in 1995, with the first meeting of the "ICPSR Committee on Survey Documentation" (what was to become the Data Documentation Initiative Committee) held in conjunction with the annual meeting of the International Association of Social Science Information Services and Technology (IASSIST). The first version of the DDI DTD was developed as an SGML DTD in 1996, which was converted into an XML DTD in 1997. Funding from the U.S. National Science Foundation supported the development, beta testing, and broader refinement. The first official version of the DDI specification (version 1.0) was published in March 2000. The initiative subsequently expanded from the documentation of social science datasets to include lifecycle-oriented metadata and cross-domain integration. In March 2026, the International Organization for Standardization (ISO) published ISO/PAS 25955:2026, describing the shared and interoperable features of the DDI family of standards.

== Principal DDI specifications ==
The Data Documentation Initiative maintains three principal metadata specifications: DDI-Codebook, DDI-Lifecycle, and DDI Cross-Domain Integration (DDI-CDI). Each addresses different requirements for documenting and managing research data. The DDI Common Core defines and specifies the set of elements that sit at the core of all DDI products.

=== DDI-Codebook ===
First officially released as DDI 1.0 in 2000, DDI-Codebook (DDI-C) is designed primarily for documenting individual datasets, especially those associated with social science surveys. It supports structured descriptions of studies, data files, variables, questions, methodologies, and related materials.

DDI-Codebook originated as a machine-readable representation of traditional social science survey codebooks. Its straightforward, hierarchical structure supports dataset discovery, dissemination, and archiving.

The latest version, DDI-Codebook 2.6, was published in April 2026.

=== DDI-Lifecycle ===
First released as DDI 3.0 in 2008, DDI-Lifecycle (DDI-L) expands on the idea of DDI-Codebook and provides a more comprehensive framework for documenting research data throughout the data lifecycle, from conceptualization and study design through collection, processing, analysis, dissemination, and reuse. DDI-Lifecycle is appropriate for longitudinal, linked, and other complex datasets

Unlike DDI-Codebook, DDI-Lifecycle supports the structured description and reuse of metadata objects across studies and over time. This includes concepts, questions, variables, classifications, and other aspects of research data production.

The latest version, DDI-Lifecycle 3.3, was published in April 2020. DDI-Lifecycle 4.0, released for public review in October 2026, introduces a model-based architecture supporting multiple technical representations.

=== DDI Cross-Domain Integration ===
First released in 2025, DDI Cross-Domain Integration (DDI-CDI) is a domain-independent metadata specification designed to describe data structures, relationships, and processing activities.

DDI-CDI is intended as complementary to DDI-Codebook and DDI-Lifecycle, rather than a replacement or continuation. DDI-CDI supports the integration of data from different sources, formats, and scientific disciplines. It describes data structures and their components, representing relationships among datasets and the transformations in machine-actionable form.

The latest version, DDI-CDI 1.0, was published in January 2025.

=== DDI Common Core ===
The DDI Common Core describes concepts and structures shared across DDI specifications, including the Variable Cascade, Unit Cascade, and Value Domains.

In March 2026, the International Organization for Standardization (ISO) published ISO/PAS 25955:2026, Information and documentation — Technical interoperability — Data Documentation Initiative (DDI). The publication describes the shared and interoperable features of DDI standards and related products.

== Other supporting DDI standards and products ==
In addition to its principal metadata specifications, the DDI Alliance maintains several other standards and products that support statistical classifications, data transformation documentation, standardized terminology, and metadata interoperability.

=== XKOS ===
Extended Knowledge Organization System (XKOS) is an extension of the W3C Simple Knowledge Organization System (SKOS) designed to support the description and management of statistical classifications. First released in 2019, XKOS provides additional properties for representing classification structures, relationships between concepts, and changes to classifications over time.

=== SDTL ===
Structured Data Transformation Language (SDTL) is an intermediate language for representing data transformation commands independently of statistical software packages. First released in 2020, it supports machine-actionable descriptions of variable-level data transformation histories, such as recoding variables and merging files, and facilitates the documentation of data provenance.

=== DDI Controlled Vocabularies ===
The DDI Controlled Vocabularies provide standardized terms for describing research data and metadata. They support consistent metadata creation, exchange, and interpretation across systems and organizations.

=== DDI Agency Registry ===
The DDI Alliance also maintains the DDI Agency Registry, which registers unique identifiers for organizations responsible for creating and maintaining DDI metadata. These identifiers are used in DDI Uniform Resource Names (URNs) to support the identification and referencing of metadata objects.

== Use cases ==
DDI is used internationally by research institutions, statistical agencies, and data archives to document, manage, and disseminate research data. Use cases include creating machine-readable codebooks, documenting survey questionnaires, developing question banks that support the identification and reuse of questions across surveys, and creating online data catalogs. DDI is also used to document data provenance, capture information about computer-assisted interviews, and document and compare variables across datasets and longitudinal studies.

== Adoption ==
Organizations that have adopted DDI include the Central Statistics Office (Ireland), the Consortium of European Social Science Data Archives (CESSDA ERIC), the German Socio-Economic Panel Study, GESIS – Leibniz Institute for the Social Sciences, the Inter-university Consortium for Political and Social Research (ICPSR), Statistics Netherlands, the UK Data Archive, the Minnesota Population Center, and the World Bank Development Data Group. DDI is also supported by research data software platforms, including Colectica and the Dataverse Project, developed by the Institute for Quantitative Social Science at Harvard University.

== Technical architecture ==
DDI uses structured, machine-readable metadata to support the documentation, exchange, and reuse of research data across information systems. Its specifications standardize structures for describing studies, datasets, variables, concepts, and research processes. DDI also supports persistent identification and referencing of metadata objects through its Uniform Resource Name (URN) namespace, registered with the Internet Assigned Numbers Authority (IANA).

DDI was originally developed using XML Document Type Definitions (DTDs), with later versions adopting XML Schema. DDI-Codebook and DDI-Lifecycle (versions 3.3 and earlier) use XML-based representations, while DDI-CDI and DDI-Lifecycle (version 4.0) use model-based approaches supporting multiple technical representations, including XML, JSON, and RDF, with UML used to express the underlying information models.

== Relationship to other metadata standards ==
DDI also supports interoperability with other metadata standards through mappings and alignment of metadata structures. DDI-Codebook and DDI-Lifecycle incorporate elements compatible with Dublin Core for resource description, while DDI-Lifecycle aligns with ISO/IEC 11179 for metadata registries, the Generic Statistical Information Model (GSIM) for statistical information, and Statistical Data and Metadata eXchange (SDMX) for multidimensional statistical data. DDI-CDI can also be used alongside the W3C Data Catalog Vocabulary (DCAT) for dataset discovery, the PROV model for provenance information, and the Simple Knowledge Organization System (SKOS) for representing concepts and classifications.

== DDI Alliance ==
The DDI Alliance is an international membership organization that creates, maintains, and supports the adoption of the Data Documentation Initiative standards and products. Established in 2003, the Alliance comprises more than 40 member institutions worldwide.

The Alliance is led by core bodies that work together to guide strategy, oversee operations, and drive the development of DDI standards. The Executive Board is the Alliance's policymaking and oversight body. The Scientific Board guides the technical and scientific work of the Alliance. The Technical Committee coordinates the development and maintenance of DDI specifications. Working groups and community contributors support the development of standards and related products.

The Alliance's day-to-day operations are coordinated by a small Secretariat hosted by the Inter-university Consortium for Political and Social Research (ICPSR) at the University of Michigan.
