= Colectica =

Statistics software suite

- Developer: Colectica
- Release: January 6, 2010
- Stable release: 8.0.11218 / September 17, 2026; 11 days ago
- Written in: C#, java
- Operating system: Microsoft Windows, Linux, and macOS
- Platform: .NET
- Standards: Data Documentation Initiative, ISO/IEC 11179, ISO/PAS 25955 and SDMX
- Type: Statistical survey
- License: Commercial software
- Website: colectica.com
- Repository: github.com/Colectica/

Colectica is a suite of programs for use in documenting official statistics and specifying statistical surveys using open standards that enable researchers, archivists, and programmers to perform:

- questionnaire design
- automatic programming for computer-assisted telephone interviewing systems
- data entry, retrieval, and management
- statistical analysis
- microdata documentation and management
- applications development
- data warehousing
- metadata standards creation such as Data Documentation Initiative

Colectica is currently in use by a variety of university survey research groups, longitudinal studies, National Statistics Offices, data archives, and commercial survey research organizations.

== History ==
Colectica was originally funded in part by the NIH National Institute on Aging to explore automatic documentation of computer assisted surveys. This grant saw the creation of metadata extraction and flowchart creation tools for CASES, Blaise, and CSPro survey instrument source code. The grant also partially funded the creation of a questionnaire specification content area in the Data Documentation Initiative's DDI Lifecycle metadata standard. The functionality of these tools, originally named SurveyViz, is now bundled with the Colectica Designer and based on the DDI standard.

The NIH funds many long-running longitudinal studies that have collected vast amounts of data, which due to their design require detailed documentation and organization. In 2011, the NIH National Institute on Aging provided further funding to add longitudinal data management functionality to Colectica to enable documenting the complex study designs. In 2023 NIH National Institute on Aging again invested to add features that facilitate AI-assisted variable-level equivalency and harmonization in research data leveraging the NIH Common Data Elements Repository to link concepts and measures in an open format.

== See also ==
- Data Documentation Initiative
- Official statistics
- Longitudinal study
