= Bolt (network protocol) =

- Original author: Neo4j
- Stable release: Version 6.0
- Written in: Various languages
- Operating system: Any
- Platform: Cross-platform
- Type: Network protocol
- License: Creative Commons 3.0 Attribution-ShareAlike
- Website: www.neo4j.com/docs/bolt/current/

The Bolt Protocol (Bolt) is a connection oriented network protocol used for client-server communication in database applications. It operates over a TCP connection or WebSocket.

Bolt is statement-oriented, allowing a client to send messages containing a statement consisting of a single string and a set of typed parameters. The server responds to each statement with a result message and an optional stream of result records.

== History ==
The Bolt protocol was first introduced to the public in November 2015, during an interview conducted by Duncan Brown and published on DZone. The first release of software implementing the protocol occurred in December 2015, as part of a milestone release of Neo4j Server. In April 2016, Neo4j Server 3.0 was released and contained the first server implementation of the protocol, accompanied by a suite of Bolt client drivers. This release received attention from several mainstream media outlets.

== Versioning ==
The Bolt network protocol uses version negotiation to ensure compatibility between clients and servers. Clients send up to four supported protocol versions, encoded as 32-bit integers, prioritizing earlier entries. The server responds with the highest compatible version or a zero value if no match is found, closing the connection. Starting with Bolt 4.0, the protocol supports major and minor versioning. Bolt 4.3 introduced range-based minor versioning, allowing clients to specify consecutive minor versions compactly.

== Protocol overview ==
Protocol new versions are released regularly, introducing enhancements in performance, functionality, and compatibility.

=== Messaging ===
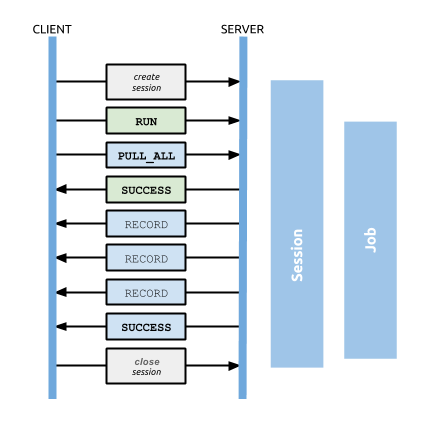
A typical interaction in the Bolt network protocol

Bolt clients and servers both send data over the connection as a sequence of messages. Each message has a type (denoted by a "signature" byte) and may include additional data. The client drives the interaction, and each message sent by the client will cause one or more response messages to be sent by the server.

The following information pertains to Bolt version 5.8 and may not reflect the latest developments in the protocol.

Client messages:

Type	Signature
HELLO	0x01
LOGON	0x6A
LOGOFF	0x6B
TELEMETRY	0x54
GOODBYE	0x02
RESET	0x0F
RUN	0x10
DISCARD	0x2F
PULL	0x3F
BEGIN	0x11
COMMIT	0x12
ROLLBACK	0x13
ROUTE	0x66

Server messages:

Type	Signature
SUCCESS	0x70
FAILURE	0x7F
IGNORED	0x7E
RECORD	0x71

=== Message transfer encoding ===
Each message is encoded into a sequence of bytes. These bytes are transferred using a binary chunked encoding, where each chunk is preceded by an unsigned, big-endian 16-bit integer denoting the number of bytes that immediately follow. A length of 0 is used to denote the end of the message.

=== Failure handling ===
A client may send multiple messages to a server, without first waiting for a response. The server processes each message sequentially. However, as there may be logical dependencies between messages sent by the client, the server will not evaluate requests it receives after sending FAILURE in response to a preceding message. Instead, it will send an IGNORED message in reply to every client message, until the client acknowledges the failure by sending an RESET message.

This is similar to the failure handling and recovery in the PostgreSQL wire protocol.

== PackStream overview - version 1 ==
PackStream is a binary presentation format for the exchange of richly-typed data. It provides a syntax layer for the Bolt messaging protocol.

=== Data encoding ===
Bolt supports encoding for a number of different data types.

Type	Description
Null	Represents the absence of a value.
Boolean	Boolean true or false.
Integer	64-bit signed integer.
Float	64-bit floating point number.
Bytes	Byte array.
String	UTF-8 encoded string.
List	Ordered collection of values.
Dictionary	Collection of key-value entries (no order guaranteed).
Structure	Composite value with a type signature.
