= TigerGraph =

American software company

- Type: Private
- Industry: Analytics software
- Predecessor: GraphSQL
- Founded: 2012
- Founder: Ruoming Jin, Li Chen, Mingxi Wu, Like Gao, Yu Xu
- Headquarters: Redwood City, California
- Key people: Rajeev Shrivastava, Chief Executive Officer
- Website: www.tigergraph.com

TigerGraph is a private company headquartered in Redwood City, California. It provides graph database and graph analytics software.

== History ==
TigerGraph was founded in 2012 by programmer Ruoming, Li, Mingxi, Like and Yu under the name GraphSQL.

In September 2017, the company came out of stealth mode under the name TigerGraph with $33 million in funding. It raised an additional $32 million in funding in September 2019 and another $105 million in a series C round in February 2021. Cumulative funding as of March 2021 is $170 million.

== Products ==
TigerGraph's hybrid transactional/analytical processing database and analytics software can scale to hundreds of terabytes of data with trillions of edges, and is used for data intensive applications such as fraud detection, customer data analysis (customer 360), IoT, artificial intelligence and machine learning. It is available using the cloud computing delivery model. The analytics uses C++ based software and a parallel processing engine to process algorithms and queries. It has its own graph query language that is similar to SQL. TigerGraph also provides a software development kit for creating graphs and visual representations.

As of Mar 2024, TigerGraph version is up to version 4.2.0

TigerGraph offers free Community Edition for developers, researchers, and educators. It can be obtained from https://dl.tigergraph.com/

== Query Language ==
GSQL , designed by Mingxi Wu and Alin Deutsch in 2015, is a SQL-like Turing complete query language. GSQL includes additions to make it compliant with the Graph Query Language standard.

== See also ==
- Graph Query Language
