= Data Catalog Vocabulary =

Data format for metadata about datasets

Data Catalog Vocabulary (DCAT) is a resource description framework, a specialized control vocabulary to promote metadata catalog interoperability across the internet. As of April 2026, most recent version of the vocabulary is DCAT Version 3. It is maintained by the World Wide Web Consortium.

By using DCAT to describe datasets in catalogs, publishers increase discoverability and enable applications to consume metadata from multiple catalogs. It enables decentralized publishing of catalogs and facilitates federated dataset search across catalogs. Aggregated DCAT metadata can serve as a manifest file to facilitate digital preservation.

The original DCAT vocabulary was developed at DERI, as an idea from Vassilios Peristeras and his master student Fadi Maali together also with Richard Cyganiak. The vocabulary was further developed by W3C's eGov Interest Group, then brought onto the Recommendation Track by W3C's "Government Linked Data" Working Group. DCAT is the foundation for open dataset descriptions in the European Union public sector and was adapted by the ISA programme of the European Commission. A 2022 report reviews DCAT‑AP compliance on national data portals.

DCAT v2 was published as a W3C Recommendation 2020-02-04. Version 2 adds support for cataloguing data services or APIs, and has stronger support for expressing relationships between datasets. An alignment to Schema.org is included.

As DCAT is extensible, more specific extensions have been created in the statistical and geodata domains.

An open-source licensed porting of the version DCAT-AP 2.0.1 compatible with NGSI-LD API standard is available in the DCAT-AP subject at Smart Data Models program.

== See also ==
- Database catalog
