= Beamtree =

Australian Medical technology company

- Founded: 1996
- Headquarters: New South Wales, Australia
- Key people: Marek Stepniak (CEO)
- Website: https://beamtree.com.au/

Beamtree (formerly Pacific Knowledge Systems) is a health data analytics company based in Sydney, Australia. Tim Kelsey was appointed chief executive in December 2020. Mark Britnell was appointed chair of the Beamtree Global Impact Committee in August 2021.

An international division was launched in the UK in 2021. The company funds an Associate Professor of Clinical Informatics and Data Science at the University of Sydney.

== Partnerships ==
Beamtree has a partnership with the University of Sydney.

It formed a partnership with the Central Adelaide Local Health Network to implement the RISQ data quality product across the network of four hospitals. Likewise, it will also support clinical decision-making for pathology services and integrate the Ainsoff Index, which is used to detect deterioration in its early stage, into the electronic medical record.

In March 2022, it set up contracts with four NHS hospital trusts in England to use its RippleDown decision support technology. The combined annual revenue is about £300,000. It also has a five-year contract with Ampath for the RippleDown software which automates up to 90% of clinical interpretations.

== Acquisitions ==
The company acquired Ainsoff Pty Ltd, a clinician-led healthcare analytics company and Potential(x), an Australian firm that provides comparative analytics in 2021. Ainsoff's founders Dr Levi Bassin and Dr David Bell joined the company.
