= IASSIST =

International Association for Social Science Information Service and Technology
- IASSIST Logo
- Abbreviation: IASSIST
- Formation: 1974; 52 years ago
- Type: Non-profit
- Purpose: "IASSIST is an international organization of professionals working with information technology and data services to support research and teaching in the social sciences."
- Region served: Worldwide
- Members: ~450
- President: Bobray Bordelon Jr.
- Volunteers: 21 (voting members)
- Website: IASSIST

The International Association for Social Science Information Service and Technology (or IASSIST) is an international organisation that provides professional development, communication and conferences for data librarians, archivists, and social science aligned information specialists. Each year, the IASSIST Fellow program sponsors members from developing nations to attend events and professional development to further the advancement of information management.

As an organisation, IASSIST seeks to promote access to research data and supports principles of good data management. Already in 2012, IASSIST members developed Quick Guide to Data Citation, which is used, among others, as a source for CESSDA’s Data Citation Guidelines. IASSIST has formally endorsed the TRUST Principles and has been an organisational member of the Research Data Alliance (RDA). The Data Rescue Project, volunteer community dedicated to access to public data for the public good, started in February 2025 as a coordinated effort of three data organisations, including members of IASSIST, RDAP Association, and the Data Curation Network.

== Conferences ==
IASSIST organizes an annual conference, typically held in May or June, focusing on data sharing and management, data access and repository tools, metadata for research data, best practices for data preservation, global information resources, new technologies, and professional development. The conference location usually rotates to a different region each year.

Year	Country	Host city	Region	Host organisation(s)	Theme	Start date	End date
2027	Canada	Vancouver	Canada	Simon Fraser University and University of British Columbia		2027-05-25	2027-05-28
2026		Online	All	IASSIST	Championing Data: Data Professionals at the Nexus	2026-6-02	2026-6-05
2025	UK	Bristol	Europe	University West of England	IASSIST at 50! Bridging oceans, harbouring data & anchoring the future	2025-06-03	2025-06-06
2024	Canada	Halifax	Canada	IASSIST with representation from Dalhousie University, Mount Saint Vincent University, and Cape Breton University	Navigating the Future of Data	2024-05-28	2024-05-31
2023	United States	Philadelphia	United States	IASSIST	Diversity in Research: Social Justice from Data	2023-05-30	2023-06-02
2022	Sweden	Gothenburg	Europe	Swedish National Data Service - SND	Data by Design: Building a Sustainable Data Culture	2022-06-7	2022-06-10
2021		Online	All	IASSIST	IASSIST Global Virtual Conference 2021	2021-05-18	2021-5-22
2019	Australia	Sydney	Asia/Pacific	Australian Data Archive, University of New South Wales, Aristotle Cloud Services Australia	Data Down Under: Exploring “Data Firsts”	2019-05-27	2019-05-31
2018	Canada	Montréal	Canada	McGill University, Concordia University, Université de Montréal	Once upon a data point: sustaining our data storytellers	2018-05-29	2018-06-01
2017	United States	Lawrence	United States	University of Kansas, Kansas University Libraries, Institute for Policy and Social Research, Federal Reserve Bank of Kansas City	Data in the middle: The common language of research	2017-05-23	2017-05-26
2016	Norway	Bergen	Europe	NSD - Norwegian Centre for Research Data	Embracing the 'Data Revolution': Opportunities and challenges for research	2016-05-31	2016-06-03
2015	United States	Minneapolis	United States	University of Minnesota	Bridging the data divide: Data in the international context	2015-06-02	2015-06-05
2014	Canada	Toronto	Canada	University of Toronto, Ryerson University, York University	Aligning data and research infrastructure	2014-06-03	2014-06-06
2013	Germany	Cologne	Europe	GESIS – Leibniz Institute for the Social Sciences	Data innovation: Increasing accessibility, visibility, and sustainability	2013-05-28	2013-05-31
2012	United States	Washington D.C.	United States	National Opinion Research Center (NORC)	Data science for a connected world: Unlocking and harnessing the power of information	2012-06-04	2012-06-08
2011	Canada	Vancouver	Canada	Simon Fraser University, University of British Columbia	Data science professionals: A global community of sharing	2011-05-31	2011-06-03
2010	United States	Ithaca	United States	Cornell Institute for Social and Economic Research (CISER), Cornell University Library	Social data and social networking: Connecting social science communities across the globe	2010-06-01	2010-06-04
2009	Finland	Tampere	Europe	Finnish Social Science Data Archive (fi), University of Tampere	Mobile data and the life cycle	2009-05-26	2009-05-29
2008	United States	Palo Alto	United States	Stanford University Libraries and Academic Information Resources	Technology of data: Collection, communication, access and preservation	2008-05-27	2008-05-30
2007	Canada	Montréal	Canada	McGill University	Building global knowledge communities with open data	2007-05-16	2007-05-18
2006	United States	Ann Arbour	United States	Inter-university Consortium for Political and Social Research (ICPSR), University of Michigan School of Information Science, University of Michigan Library	Data in a world of networked knowledge	2006-05-24	2006-05-26
2005	United Kingdom	Edinburgh	Europe	EDINA National Data Center, Edinburgh University Data Library	Evidence and enlightenment	2005-05-24	2005-05-27
2004	United States	Madison	United States	Data and Program Library Service, University of Wisconsin-Madison	Data futures: Building on 30 years of advocacy	2004-05-24	2004-05-28
2003	Canada	Ottawa	Canada	University of Ottawa	Strength in numbers	2003-05-27	2003-05-30
2002	United States	Storrs	United States	Roper Center for Public Opinion Research, University of Connecticut	Accelerating access, collaboration and dissemination	2002-06-10	2002-06-14
2001	Netherlands	Amsterdam	Europe	University of Amsterdam	A data odyssey: collaborative working in the social science cyber space	2001-05-15	2001-05-17
2000	United States	Chicago	United States	Northwestern University	Data in the digital library: charting the future for social, spatial and government data	2000-06-07	2000-06-10
1999	Canada	Toronto	Canada	Ryerson Polytechnic University Library, University of Toronto Data Library Service	Building bridges, breaking barriers: the future of data in the global network	1999-05-17	1999-05-21
1998	United States	New Haven	United States	Yale University	Global access, local support: social science computing in the age of the World Wide Web	1998-05-19	1998-05-22
1997	Denmark	Odense	Europe	Danish Data Archives	Data frontiers in the infoscape	1997-05-06	1997-05-09
1996	United States	Minneapolis	United States	University of Minnesota Electronic Research Center	Weaving the web of social science research, data and support	1996-05-15	1996-05-17
1995	Canada	Québec City	Canada	Université Laval	Partners for access: working together in a changing data environment/L'access aux données dans un environnement en pleine mutation: un partenariat à developer	1995-05-09	1995-05-12
1994	United States	San Francisco	United States	University of California	Building bridges: resources, technology and global issues	1994-05-03	1994-05-06
1993	United Kingdom	Edinburgh	Europe	University of Edinburgh Data Library	Openness, diversity and standards: sharing data resources	1993-05-00	1993-05-00
1992	United States	Madison	United States	University of Wisconsin, Madison Data and Program Library Service	Data, networks, and cooperation: linking resources in a distributed world	1992-05-26	1992-05-29
1991	Canada	Edmonton	Canada	University of Alberta Data Library	Data in the global village: stewardship of an expanding resource	1991-05-14	1991-05-17
1990	United States	Poughkeepsie	United States	n/a	Numbers, pictures, words and sounds: priorities for the 1990s	1990-05-30	1990-06-03
1989	Israel	Jerusalem	Europe	Hebrew University Social Sciences Data Archive	Value of research data for government and business	1989-05-15	1989-05-18
1988	United States	Washington D.C.	United States	U.S. National Archives and Records Administration	Public data: use it or lose it	1988-05-26	1988-05-29
1987	Canada	Vancouver	Canada	Simon Fraser University Research Data Centre, University of British Columbia Data Library	n/a	1987-05-19	1987-05-22
1986	United States	Marina Del Rey	United States	n/a	Amidst technological turmoil: innovation and progress	1986-05-22	1986-05-25
1985	Netherlands	Amsterdam	Europe	Steinmetzarchief	Public access to public data	1985-05-20	1985-05-24
1984	Canada	Ottawa	Canada	Public Archives of Canada	Coming of age in the brave new world	1984-05-14	1984-05-18
1983	United States	Philadelphia	United States	n/a	n/a	1983-05-19	1983-05-22
1982	United States	San Diego	United States	n/a	Impact for the 80's: the integration of data services, processing, and utilization	1982-05-27	1982-05-30
1981	France	Grenoble	Europe	n/a	The impact of computerisation on social science research: data services and technological developments	1981-09-14	1981-09-18
1980	United States	Washington D.C.	United States	U.S. National Archives and Records Administration	International perspectives on statistical data for the social sciences: policy, technology, and management	1980-05-02	1980-05-04
1979	Canada	Ottawa	Canada	Public Archives of Canada	Data archiving: models for international cooperation	1979-05-07	1979-05-10
1978	Sweden	Uppsala	Europe	n/a	n/a	1978-08-14	1978-08-20
1978	United States	Itasca	United States	n/a	State of the art: perspectives	1978-02-08	1978-02-11
1977	Denmark	Copenhagen	Europe	Danish Data Archives	Western European Conference	1977-06-00	1977-06-00
1977	Canada	Toronto	Canada	Ontario Institute for Studies in Education (OISE)	Canada conference	1977-05-00	1977-05-00
1977	United States	Cocoa Beach	United States	n/a	1st Joint Canada/U.S. IASSIST conference	1977-02-16	1977-02-20

== History ==
IASSIST was formed in 1974. It emerged to manage and increase access to the growing amount of machine-readable social science data. The first IASSIST conference was held in 1977 in Cocoa Beach, Florida with 29 representatives from Canada and the United States.

== Africa Chapter ==
The IASSIST Africa Chapter is currently the only Regional Chapter of IASSIST. Regional chapters of IASSIST support the expedient and efficient management of IASSIST affairs and activities within their regions. The Africa Chapter was officially launched in 2021 during the first IASSIST Africa Regional Workshop held in Kampala, Uganda. It has members from several African countries and holds an annual regional workshop where members come together to discuss and share emerging trends and issues in IT, research and data services.

== IASSIST Quarterly (IQ) ==
The IASSIST Quarterly (ISSN: 2331-4141 Online, 0739–1137 Print) is a peer-reviewed, indexed, open access quarterly journal of articles dealing with social science information and data services. IQ represents an international cooperative effort on the part of individuals managing, operating, or using machine-readable data archives, data libraries, and data services. The IQ is published by the IASSIST and hosted by the University of Alberta Libraries.
