= Canberra Innovation Network =

Australian Capital Territory government initiative

- Abbreviation: CBRIN
- Formation: 7 November 2014
- Founder: ACT Government
- Founded at: Canberra
- Type: NGO
- Legal status: charity
- Purpose: empowering entrepreneurs
- Headquarters: Canberra
- Location: Canberra, Australia
- Region served: ACT
- Services: innovation ecosystem support and growth
- Members: Australian National University Canberra Institute of Technology; University of Canberra; University of New South Wales (2015)
- CEO: Petr Adamek
- Key people: CEO Petr Adamek, GM Growth Dr Craig Davis, COO Sharyn Smith
- Main organ: Board of Directors
- Staff: 12
- Website: http://CBRIN.com.au

The CBR Innovation Network (also Canberra Innovation Network or CBRIN) is an initiative of the government of the Australian Capital Territory, that was founded in 2014, and established to accelerate innovation and diversify the economy in the ACT region. The CBR Innovation Network is based on the collaboration of its four Foundation Members: the Australian National University, Canberra Institute of Technology, the University of Canberra, and the University of New South Wales (Canberra, ADFA). One of the Canberra Innovation Network's primary objectives has been the creation of an innovation district in Canberra, which features a business incubator program, a start-up accelerator program and a co-working space.

== History ==
A need for targeted innovation-led economic development in Canberra was identified by the ACT Government’s Economic Development Directorate in 2014.^{[2]} Canberra Innovation Network was subsequently established in November 2014, with the goal of accelerating innovation and diversifying the ACT region's economy.^{[1]}

== Programs ==
Canberra Innovation Network supports a range of programs within the ACT, including:

- Coworking, a co-working space for entrepreneurs and startups.^{[5]}

- GRIFFIN Accelerator, a 3-month intensive mentoring program for startups.^{[7]}

- Incubator, a mentorship, coworking and learning program for startups^{[8]}

- Innovation Connect Grant, a grant that supports early innovative, entrepreneurial ideas^{[9]}

- Collaborative innovation program, for corporates and innovators to engage in open innovation through hackathons, co-designs, collab labs and makerspaces

- The Mill House Ventures programs, to accelerate emergence, growth and viability of social enterprises in the Canberra region
