= Data model =

Abstract model

Overview of a data-modeling context: Data model is based on Data, Data relationship, Data semantic and Data constraint. A data model provides the details of information to be stored, and is of primary use when the final product is the generation of computer software code for an application or the preparation of a functional specification to aid a computer software make-or-buy decision. The figure is an example of the interaction between process and data models.

A data model is an abstract model that organizes elements of data and standardizes how they relate to one another and to the properties of real-world entities. For instance, a data model may specify that the data element representing a car be composed of a number of other elements which, in turn, represent the color and size of the car and define its owner.

The corresponding professional activity is called generally data modeling or, more specifically, database design. Data models are typically specified by a data expert, data specialist, data scientist, data librarian, or a data scholar. A data modeling language and notation are often represented in graphical form as diagrams.

A data model can sometimes be referred to as a data structure, especially in the context of programming languages. Data models are often complemented by function models, especially in the context of enterprise models.

A data model explicitly determines the structure of data; conversely, structured data is data organized according to an explicit data model or data structure. Structured data is in contrast to unstructured data and semi-structured data.

== Concepts ==
The term data model can refer to two distinct but closely related concepts. Sometimes it refers to an abstract formalization of the objects and relationships found in a particular application domain: for example the customers, products, and orders found in a manufacturing organization. At other times it refers to the set of concepts used in defining such formalizations: for example concepts such as entities, attributes, relations, or tables. So the "data model" of a banking application may be defined using the entity–relationship "data model". This article uses the term in both senses.

Managing large quantities of structured and unstructured data is a primary function of information systems. Data models describe the structure, manipulation, and integrity aspects of the data stored in data management systems such as relational databases. They may also describe data with a looser structure, such as word processing documents, email messages, pictures, digital audio, and video: XDM, for example, provides a data model for XML documents.

=== The role of data models ===
How data models deliver benefit

The main aim of data models is to support the development of information systems by providing the definition and format of data. According to West and Fowler (1999) "if this is done consistently across systems then compatibility of data can be achieved. If the same data structures are used to store and access data then different applications can share data. The results of this are indicated above. However, systems and interfaces often cost more than they should, to build, operate, and maintain. They may also constrain the business rather than support it. A major cause is that the quality of the data models implemented in systems and interfaces is poor".

- "Business rules, specific to how things are done in a particular place, are often fixed in the structure of a data model. This means that small changes in the way business is conducted lead to large changes in computer systems and interfaces".
- "Entity types are often not identified, or incorrectly identified. This can lead to replication of data, data structure, and functionality, together with the attendant costs of that duplication in development and maintenance".
- "Data models for different systems are arbitrarily different. The result of this is that complex interfaces are required between systems that share data. These interfaces can account for between 25–70% of the cost of current systems".
- "Data cannot be shared electronically with customers and suppliers, because the structure and meaning of data has not been standardized. For example, engineering design data and drawings for process plant are still sometimes exchanged on paper".

The reason for these problems is a lack of standards that will ensure that data models will both meet business needs and be consistent.

A data model explicitly determines the structure of data. Typical applications of data models include database models, design of information systems, and enabling exchange of data. Usually, data models are specified in a data modeling language.[3]

=== Three perspectives ===
The ANSI/SPARC three level architecture. This shows that a data model can be an external model (or view), a conceptual model, or a physical model. This is not the only way to look at data models, but it is a useful way, particularly when comparing models.

A data model instance may be one of three kinds according to ANSI in 1975:

1. Conceptual data model: describes the semantics of a domain, being the scope of the model. For example, it may be a model of the interest area of an organization or industry. This consists of entity classes, representing kinds of things of significance in the domain, and relationship assertions about associations between pairs of entity classes. A conceptual schema specifies the kinds of facts or propositions that can be expressed using the model. In that sense, it defines the allowed expressions in an artificial 'language' with a scope that is limited by the scope of the model.
2. Logical data model: describes the semantics, as represented by a particular data manipulation technology. This consists of descriptions of tables and columns, object oriented classes, and XML tags, among other things.
3. Physical data model: describes the physical means by which data are stored. This is concerned with partitions, CPUs, tablespaces, and the like.

The significance of this approach, according to ANSI, is that it allows the three perspectives to be relatively independent of each other. Storage technology can change without affecting either the logical or the conceptual model. The table/column structure can change without (necessarily) affecting the conceptual model. In each case, of course, the structures must remain consistent with the other model. The table/column structure may be different from a direct translation of the entity classes and attributes, but it must ultimately carry out the objectives of the conceptual entity class structure. Early phases of many software development projects emphasize the design of a conceptual data model. Such a design can be detailed into a logical data model. In later stages, this model may be translated into physical data model. However, it is also possible to implement a conceptual model directly.

== History ==
One of the earliest pioneering works in modeling information systems was done by Young and Kent (1958), who argued for "a precise and abstract way of specifying the informational and time characteristics of a data processing problem". They wanted to create "a notation that should enable the analyst to organize the problem around any piece of hardware". Their work was the first effort to create an abstract specification and invariant basis for designing different alternative implementations using different hardware components. The next step in IS modeling was taken by CODASYL, an IT industry consortium formed in 1959, who essentially aimed at the same thing as Young and Kent: the development of "a proper structure for machine-independent problem definition language, at the system level of data processing". This led to the development of a specific IS information algebra.

In the 1960s data modeling gained more significance with the initiation of the management information system (MIS) concept. According to Leondes (2002), "during that time, the information system provided the data and information for management purposes. The first generation database system, called Integrated Data Store (IDS), was designed by Charles Bachman at General Electric. Two famous database models, the network data model and the hierarchical data model, were proposed during this period of time". Towards the end of the 1960s, Edgar F. Codd worked out his theories of data arrangement, and proposed the relational model for database management based on first-order predicate logic.

In the 1970s entity–relationship modeling emerged as a new type of conceptual data modeling, originally formalized in 1976 by Peter Chen. Entity–relationship models were being used in the first stage of information system design during the requirements analysis to describe information needs or the type of information that is to be stored in a database. This technique can describe any ontology, i.e., an overview and classification of concepts and their relationships, for a certain area of interest.

In the 1970s G.M. Nijssen developed "Natural Language Information Analysis Method" (NIAM) method, and developed this in the 1980s in cooperation with Terry Halpin into Object–Role Modeling (ORM). However, it was Terry Halpin's 1989 PhD thesis that created the formal foundation on which Object–Role Modeling is based.

Bill Kent, in his 1978 book Data and Reality, compared a data model to a map of a territory, emphasizing that in the real world, "highways are not painted red, rivers don't have county lines running down the middle, and you can't see contour lines on a mountain". In contrast to other researchers who tried to create models that were mathematically clean and elegant, Kent emphasized the essential messiness of the real world, and the task of the data modeler to create order out of chaos without excessively distorting the truth.

In the 1980s, according to Jan L. Harrington (2000), "the development of the object-oriented paradigm brought about a fundamental change in the way we look at data and the procedures that operate on data. Traditionally, data and procedures have been stored separately: the data and their relationship in a database, the procedures in an application program. Object orientation, however, combined an entity's procedure with its data."

During the early 1990s, three Dutch mathematicians Guido Bakema, Harm van der Lek, and JanPieter Zwart, continued the development on the work of G.M. Nijssen. They focused more on the communication part of the semantics. In 1997 they formalized the method Fully Communication Oriented Information Modeling FCO-IM.

== Types ==
=== Database model ===
A database model is a specification describing how a database is structured and used.

Several such models have been suggested. Common models include:

Flat model
This may not strictly qualify as a data model. The flat (or table) model consists of a single, two-dimensional array of data elements, where all members of a given column are assumed to be similar values, and all members of a row are assumed to be related to one another.
Hierarchical model
The hierarchical model is similar to the network model except that links in the hierarchical model form a tree structure, while the network model allows arbitrary graph.
Network model
The network model, also graph model, organizes data using two fundamental constructs, called records and sets. Records (or nodes) contain fields (i.e. attributes), and sets (or edges) define one-to-many, many-to-many and many-to-one relationships between records: one owner, many members. The network data model is an abstraction of the design concept used in the implementation of databases. Network models emphasise interconnectedness, making them ideal for applications where relationships are crucial, like social networks or recommendation systems. This structure allows for efficient querying of relationships without expensive joins.
Relational model
is a database model based on first-order predicate logic. Its core idea is to describe a database as a collection of predicates over a finite set of predicate variables, describing constraints on the possible values and combinations of values. The power of the relational data model lies in its mathematical foundations and a simple user-level paradigm.
Object–relational model
Similar to a relational database model, but objects, classes, and inheritance are directly supported in database schemas and in the query language.
Object–role modeling
A method of data modeling that has been defined as "attribute free", and "fact-based". The result is a verifiably correct system, from which other common artifacts, such as ERD, UML, and semantic models may be derived. Associations between data objects are described during the database design procedure, such that normalization is an inevitable result of the process.
Star schema
The simplest style of data warehouse schema. The star schema consists of a few "fact tables" (possibly only one, justifying the name) referencing any number of "dimension tables". The star schema is considered an important special case of the snowflake schema.

Flat model

Hierarchical model

Network model

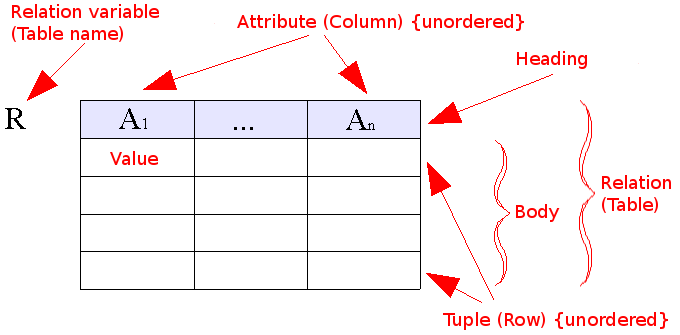
Relational model

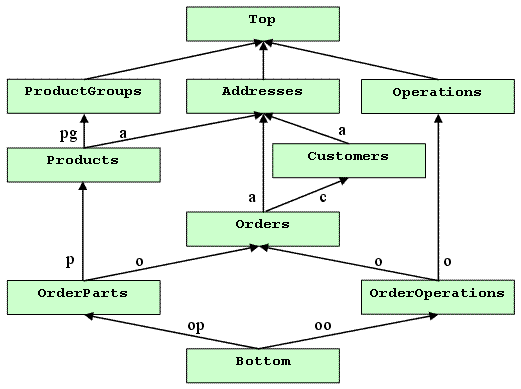
Concept-oriented model

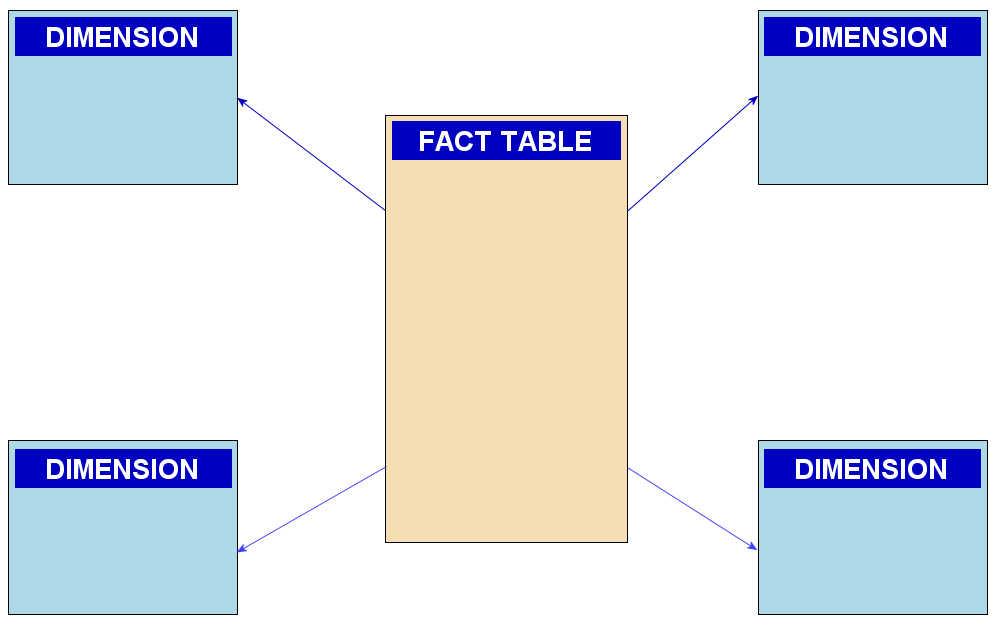
Star schema

=== Data structure diagram ===
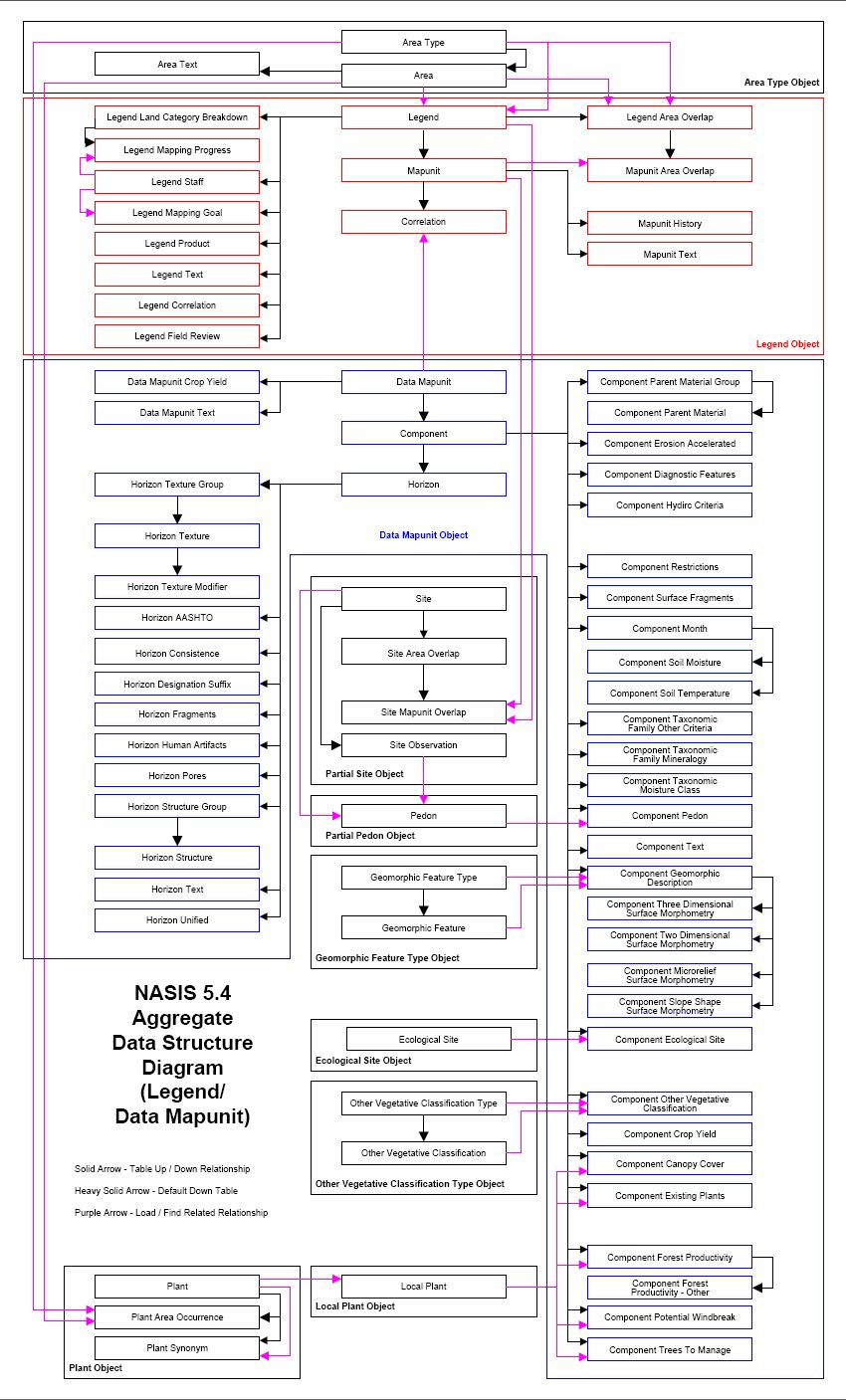
Example of a Data Structure Diagram

A data structure diagram (DSD) is a diagram and data model used to describe conceptual data models by providing graphical notations which document entities and their relationships, and the constraints that bind them. The basic graphic elements of DSDs are boxes, representing entities, and arrows, representing relationships. Data structure diagrams are most useful for documenting complex data entities.

Data structure diagrams are an extension of the entity–relationship model (ER model). In DSDs, attributes are specified inside the entity boxes rather than outside of them, while relationships are drawn as boxes composed of attributes which specify the constraints that bind entities together. DSDs differ from the ER model in that the ER model focuses on the relationships between different entities, whereas DSDs focus on the relationships of the elements within an entity and enable users to fully see the links and relationships between each entity.

There are several styles for representing data structure diagrams, with the notable difference in the manner of defining cardinality. The choices are between arrow heads, inverted arrow heads (crow's feet), or numerical representation of the cardinality.

=== Entity–relationship model ===
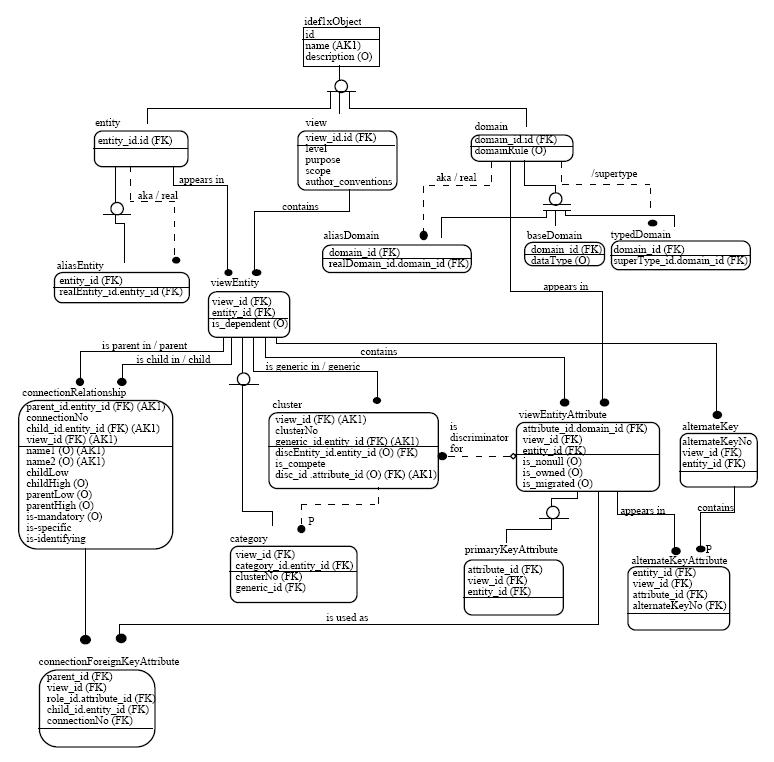
Example of an IDEF1X entity–relationship diagrams used to model IDEF1X itself

An entity–relationship model (ERM), sometimes referred to as an entity–relationship diagram (ERD), could be used to represent an abstract conceptual data model (or semantic data model or physical data model) used in software engineering to represent structured data. There are several notations used for ERMs. Like DSD's, attributes are specified inside the entity boxes rather than outside of them, while relationships are drawn as lines, with the relationship constraints as descriptions on the line. The E-R model, while robust, can become visually cumbersome when representing entities with several attributes.

There are several styles for representing data structure diagrams, with a notable difference in the manner of defining cardinality. The choices are between arrow heads, inverted arrow heads (crow's feet), or numerical representation of the cardinality.

=== Geographic data model ===
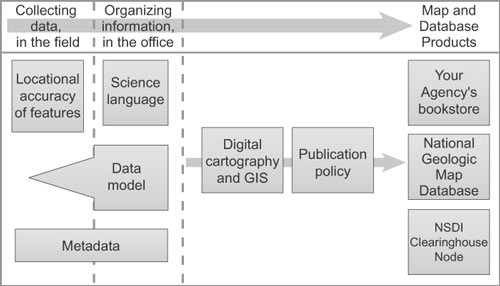
Groups relate to process of making a map

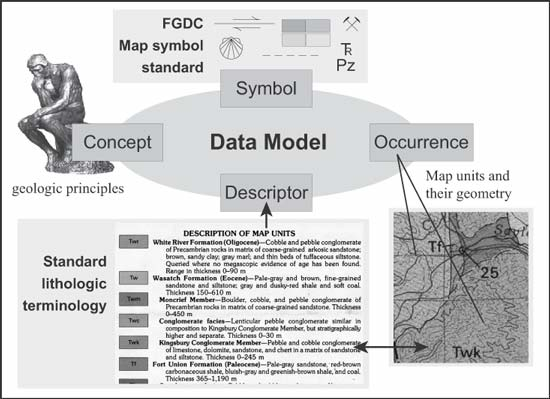
NGMDB data model applications

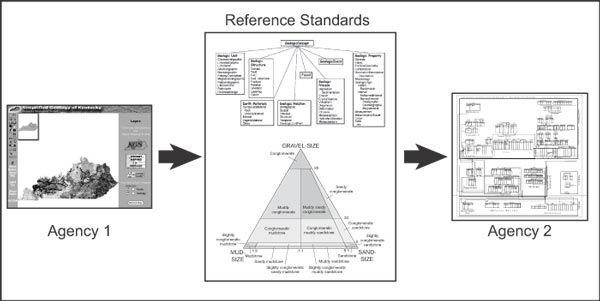
NGMDB databases linked together

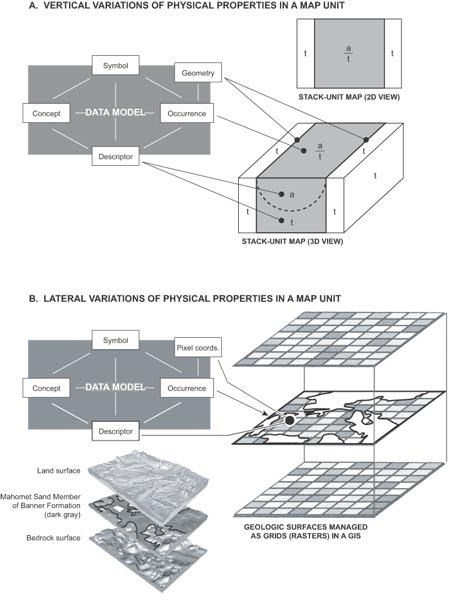
Representing 3D map information

A geographic data model, geospatial geographical measurements, or simply data from modules in the context of geographic information systems (GIS), is a mathematical and digital structure for representing phenomena over the Earth. Generally, such data modules represent various aspects of these phenomena by means of statistical data measurement, including locations, change over time. For example, the vector graphic data model represents geography as collections of points, lines, and arrays, and the elimination data model represent geography as space matrices that store numeric values. Data models are implemented throughout the GIS ecosystem, including the software tools for data management and spatial analysis, data stored in very specific languages of GIS file formats specifications and standards, and specific designs for GIS installations.

While the unique nature of spatial information has led to its own set of model structures, much of the process of data modeling is similar to the rest of information technology, including the progression from conceptual models to logical models, and the difference between generic models and application-specific design.

=== Generic data model ===
Generic data models are generalizations of conventional data models. They define standardized general relation types, together with the kinds of things that may be related by such a relation type. Generic data models are developed as an approach to solving some shortcomings of conventional data models. For example, different modelers usually produce different conventional data models of the same domain. This can lead to difficulty in bringing the models of different people together and is an obstacle for data exchange and data integration. Invariably, however, this difference is attributable to different levels of abstraction in the models and differences in the kinds of facts that can be instantiated (the semantic expression capabilities of the models). The modelers need to communicate and agree on certain elements that are to be rendered more concretely, in order to make the differences less significant.

=== Semantic data model ===
Semantic data models

A semantic data model in software engineering is a technique to define the meaning of data within the context of its interrelationships with other data. A semantic data model is an abstraction that defines how the stored symbols relate to the real world. A semantic data model is sometimes called a conceptual data model.

The logical data structure of a database management system (DBMS), whether hierarchical, network, or relational, cannot totally satisfy the requirements for a conceptual definition of data because it is limited in scope and biased toward the implementation strategy employed by the DBMS. Therefore, the need to define data from a conceptual view has led to the development of semantic data modeling techniques. That is, techniques to define the meaning of data within the context of its interrelationships with other data. As illustrated in the figure. The real world, in terms of resources, ideas, events, etc., are symbolically defined within physical data stores. A semantic data model is an abstraction that defines how the stored symbols relate to the real world. Thus, the model must be a true representation of the real world.

== Topics ==
=== Data architecture ===
Data architecture is the design of data for use in defining the target state and the subsequent planning needed to hit the target state. It is usually one of several architecture domains that form the pillars of an enterprise architecture or solution architecture.

A data architecture describes the data structures used by a business and/or its applications. There are descriptions of data in storage and data in motion; descriptions of data stores, data groups, and data items; and mappings of those data artifacts to data qualities, applications, locations, etc.

Essential to realizing the target state, Data architecture describes how data is processed, stored, and utilized in a given system. It provides criteria for data processing operations that make it possible to design data flows and also control the flow of data in the system.

=== Data modeling ===
The data modeling process

Data modeling in software engineering is the process of creating a data model by applying formal data model descriptions using data modeling techniques. Data modeling is a technique for defining business requirements for a database. It is sometimes called database modeling because a data model is eventually implemented in a database.

The figure illustrates the way data models are developed and used today. A conceptual data model is developed based on the data requirements for the application that is being developed, perhaps in the context of an activity model. The data model will normally consist of entity types, attributes, relationships, integrity rules, and the definitions of those objects. This is then used as the start point for interface or database design.

=== Data properties ===
Some important properties of data

Some important properties of data for which requirements need to be met are:

- definition-related properties
  - relevance: the usefulness of the data in relation to its intended purpose or application.
  - clarity: the availability of a clear and shared definition for the data.
  - consistency: the compatibility of the same type of data from different sources.
- content-related properties
  - timeliness: the availability of data at the time required and how up-to-date that data is.
  - accuracy: how close to the truth the data is.
- properties related to both definition and content
  - completeness: how much of the required data is available.
  - accessibility: where, how, and to whom the data is available or not available (e.g. security).
  - cost: the cost incurred in obtaining the data, and making it available for use.

=== Data organization ===
Another kind of data model describes how to organize data using a database management system or other data management technology. It describes, for example, relational tables and columns or object-oriented classes and attributes. Such a data model is sometimes referred to as the physical data model, but in the original ANSI three schema architecture, it is called "logical". In that architecture, the physical model describes the storage media (cylinders, tracks, and tablespaces). Ideally, this model is derived from the more conceptual data model described above. It may differ, however, to account for constraints like processing capacity and usage patterns.

While data analysis is a common term for data modeling, the activity actually has more in common with the ideas and methods of synthesis (inferring general concepts from particular instances) than it does with analysis (identifying component concepts from more general ones). {Presumably we call ourselves systems analysts because no one can say systems synthesists.} Data modeling strives to bring the data structures of interest together into a cohesive, inseparable, whole by eliminating unnecessary data redundancies and by relating data structures with relationships.

A different approach is to use adaptive systems such as artificial neural networks that can autonomously create implicit models of data.

=== Data structure ===
A binary tree, a simple type of branching linked data structure

A data structure is a way of storing data in a computer so that it can be used efficiently. It is an organization of mathematical and logical concepts of data. Often a carefully chosen data structure will allow the most efficient algorithm to be used. The choice of the data structure often begins from the choice of an abstract data type.

A data model describes the structure of the data within a given domain and, by implication, the underlying structure of that domain itself. This means that a data model in fact specifies a dedicated grammar for a dedicated artificial language for that domain. A data model represents classes of entities (kinds of things) about which a company wishes to hold information, the attributes of that information, and relationships among those entities and (often implicit) relationships among those attributes. The model describes the organization of the data to some extent irrespective of how data might be represented in a computer system.

The entities represented by a data model can be the tangible entities, but models that include such concrete entity classes tend to change over time. Robust data models often identify abstractions of such entities. For example, a data model might include an entity class called "Person", representing all the people who interact with an organization. Such an abstract entity class is typically more appropriate than ones called "Vendor" or "Employee", which identify specific roles played by those people.

Array

Hash table

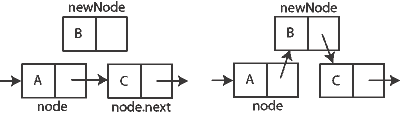
Linked list

Stack (data structure)

=== Data model theory ===
The term data model can have two meanings:

1. A data model theory, i.e. a formal description of how data may be structured and accessed.
2. A data model instance, i.e. applying a data model theory to create a practical data model instance for some particular application.

A data model theory has three main components:

- The structural part: a collection of data structures which are used to create databases representing the entities or objects modeled by the database.
- The integrity part: a collection of rules governing the constraints placed on these data structures to ensure structural integrity.
- The manipulation part: a collection of operators which can be applied to the data structures, to update and query the data contained in the database.

For example, in the relational model, the structural part is based on a modified concept of the mathematical relation; the integrity part is expressed in first-order logic and the manipulation part is expressed using the relational algebra, tuple calculus and domain calculus.

A data model instance is created by applying a data model theory. This is typically done to solve some business enterprise requirement. Business requirements are normally captured by a semantic logical data model. This is transformed into a physical data model instance from which is generated a physical database. For example, a data modeler may use a data modeling tool to create an entity–relationship model of the corporate data repository of some business enterprise. This model is transformed into a relational model, which in turn generates a relational database.

=== Patterns ===
Patterns are common data modeling structures that occur in many data models.

== See also ==
- Data-flow diagram – Graphical representation of the "flow" of data through an information system
- Information model – Software engineering visualization
- Object model – Term in computing
- Object–role modeling – Programming technique
- Unified Modeling Language – Software design modeling notation
- Business process model – Activity of representing processes of an enterprise
- Core architecture data model
- Common data model – Standardised data model for information exchange
- Data collection system
- Data dictionary – Set of metadata that contains definitions and representations of data elements
- Data Format Description Language – Modeling language for describing general text and binary data
- Distributional–relational database – Type of database management system
- JC3IEDM
- Object graph – Network representation of the relationships between objects in a program
- Process model – Definition and description of a process or system
