= Cullinet =

American software company

- Industry: Software company
- Predecessor: Cullinane Corporation
- Founded: 1968
- Founder: John Cullinane and Larry English
- Defunct: 1989
- Fate: Acquired
- Successor: Computer Associates
- Headquarters: 400 Blue Hill Avenue, Westwood, Massachusetts, United States

Cullinet was a software company whose products included the database management system IDMS and the integrated software package Goldengate. In 1989, the company was bought by Computer Associates. Cullinet was founded in Arlington, Massachusetts and later headquartered at 400 Blue Hill Drive in Westwood, Massachusetts.

== History ==
=== Early years ===
The company was started by John Cullinane and Larry English in 1968 as Cullinane Corporation. Their idea was to sell pre-packaged software to mainframe users, which was at that time a new concept in an era when enterprises only used internally developed applications or the software that came bundled with the hardware.

Rather than write its own products, Cullinane approached IT (information technology) departments (at that time called Data Processing departments) of major enterprises, particularly banks, to identify internally developed applications that he felt had potential to be productized and licensed to others. However, it proved difficult to sell these applications because most weren't generalized and supportable systems. As a result, the company decided to develop a source code management system, called PLUS, that competed with Pansophic's (Panvalet) and UCC's products (UCC-1 tape management system, etc.). The first version of PLUS (which stood for Program Library Update System) required the use of magnetic tape devices, and was not competitive with the other, disk-based products. Although the company eventually responded with a disk-based version, called PLUS-DA (which stood for Direct Access, a common name for disks at the time) they did not become successful in this market.

The first breakthrough product was a report writer named Culprit, developed in-house by Gil Curtis and Anna Marie Thron, who had built the PHI payroll system. The product competed with Mark IV from Informatics, Inc., but was perceived as a late entry in the report writer category.

The company struggled with financial stability until it branded a variation of Culprit, EDP Auditor, which was nothing more than a second name for the same product with a collection of predefined reports, but more importantly, special services aimed at the new discipline of EDP (electronic data processing) Auditing including the first EDP Auditors User, special support to give auditors independence of data processing which was very important to them. What was remarkable is that many corporations licensed essentially identical products. This led to serendipitous prosperity for Cullinane. As EDP auditors developed knowledge about business systems and computers, they could invariably produce reports faster than slower-moving, internal IT departments. As a result, MIS (management information systems) departments would feel compelled to buy the Culprit version for their own use — to compete.

=== 1970s ===
As the company prospered in the early 1970s, it was approached by a consultant to BFGoodrich, Naomi O. Seligman, to consider taking over development of a Honeywell database management system called Integrated Data Store (IDS) that had been modified to operate on IBM and IBM compatible (RCA) mainframes. IDS was originally developed by General Electric, and Bill Curtis had supposedly gotten the rights to convert the system to run on IBM equipment. The decision was made in early 1973 — primarily by John Cullinane, Jim Baker and Tom Meurer — to bet the company on the effort. Several executives joined the effort over the next three years, including Andrew Filipowski, Robert Goldman, Jon Nackerud, Ron McKinney, William Casey, Bob Davis, Bill Linn, and Ray Nawara. IDMS was to be a great bet for the company as it became the leader among many capable and popular products of the mainframe era. It competed with Cincom's Total, Software AG's ADABAS, Applied Data Research's DATACOM/DB, Computer Corporation of America's Model 204, MRI (later Intel's) System 2000 and IBM Information Management System (IMS) and DL/I. In 1976, the source code was sold to International Computers Limited (ICL), whose developers ported the software to run on their 2900 Series mainframes, and subsequently also on the older 1900 machines. ICL continued development of the software independently of Cullinane, selling the originally ported product under the name IDMS and an enhanced version as IDMSX. In this form, it was used by many large UK and international users — examples being the Pay-As-You-Earn system operated by Inland Revenue and a system for Barclays Bank in South Africa. Many of these systems are still running in 2010 on Fujitsu equipment.

John Cullinane mentored a series of future entrepreneurs and software industry executives. One of the early executives was Andrew 'Flip' Filipowski, who later founded Platinum Technology, Inc.. Another was Robert Goldman who became the CEO of several public software companies including AICorp. Jon Nackerud was a co-founder of Relational Technology, Inc., formed to commercialize the Ingres database management system. Prior to becoming a public company in 1978, the company's name was changed to Cullinane Database Systems, Inc. The company changed its name again to Cullinet Software in 1983, partly because John Cullinane wanted to distance his name from the personal connection to the business when he turned the company over to Bob Goldman, and also in a nod to the importance of computer networking (as evidenced by the company's simultaneous acquisition of Computer Pictures, whose microcomputer-based desktop system linked to IDMS data). Joe McNay, a board member, was particularly important regarding the company's IPO, the first ever in the software products industry. Greylock purchased some shares from John Cullinane in 1977, less than a year before the company was to go public. It was to be the early foundation on which their Greylock's software technology investment prowess rested. It was Greylock’s first investment in a software company.

Cullinane's public offering was of note as it was the first successful offering of a pure software products company ever and the first software company Hambrecht & Quist ever took public. Cullinet was also the first software company to have a billion dollar valuation, and the first to do a Super Bowl advertisement. Cullinane Database Systems, Inc., went public in 1978. On April 27, 1982 the company became the first computer software firm to be listed on the New York Stock Exchange and later, the first to become a component stock of the S&P 500 Index. However, two quarters after the company went public IBM introduced its 4300 series. Its salesmen told all mutual clients that IDMS didn't run on the 4300 series and that all IBM software of the future would be built with IMS/DL1. This caused a major problem as every IDMS customer went ballistic and every prospect went on hold. The company only had three months to solve this marketing problem and technical problem, and remarkably, they did. Technically, it only required the modification of one instruction to get IDMS running on a 4300. The solution to the company's revenue problem turned out to be its new Integrated Data Dictionary. By moving very fast, the company used it to put IBM on the defensive and made its numbers, no small accomplishment. It then went from winning one out five competitions to winning four out five and this fueled its growth.

Beginning in 1979, in an attempt to promote less dependence on the database sales alone, Cullinane fully integrated financial and manufacturing applications with IDMS and decision support systems, another first. The company acquired financial applications from McCormack & Dodge ("M&D"), a financial software company (acquired by Dun & Bradstreet later in 1983) and completely rewrote them using IDMS. They also acquired an MRP system from Rath & Strong and completely rewrote it using IDMS. Thus, Cullinet had a suite of integrated financial and manufacturing systems (called CIMS Cullinet Integrated Manufacturing System), the first on-line database driven applications, and was a major competitor in what is now called ERP. The company had become a software powerhouse. Eventually, it acquired a small Boston-based company called Computer Pictures whose graphics-focused decision support system TrendSpotter had already been integrated with IDMS and was very successful. This team developed Goldengate, a Lotus Symphony-like PC product.

Goldengate was a part of Cullinet's flawed ICMS (Information Center Management System). The promise of ICMS was the ability to move data between the mainframe and PC desktop. Apple Computer was supposed to do the same for the Apple Lisa, but never delivered. ICMS was unveiled in 1983 as part of a splashy 20+ city closed circuit TV broadcast that focused on IDMS/R and fueled the market for Cullinet for the next two years, but it was obvious that it was getting harder to maintain its unbroken string of quarters with sales and earnings in excess of 50%.

Goldengate was built pre-Windows, which was expensive for Cullinet because of all the permutations and combinations of PC hardware and memory configurations.

=== 1980s ===
In 1983 John Cullinane, after 25 years in the software business, handed over the helm of Cullinet to Bob Goldman. Eventually the company ran into trouble and Cullinane brought in a recent acquaintance, David Chapman, as CEO of the company. At the time, Cullinet had $50 million in cash reserves. David Chapman, a veteran IBM and Data General executive, started an aggressive campaign to acquire technology from other companies. The reason for bringing in Chapman was that the company had gotten hung up on the open architecture and relational issues. In other words, a company with an unparalleled record of outpositioning competition every two years, for sixteen years, including IBM, allowed itself to get outpositioned by IBM and others, with the help of E.F. Codd and C.J. Date.

In 1986-87, Chapman attempted to move the company to the more and more powerful minicomputers such as Digital Equipment Corporation's VAX line of computers. In the process, Cullinet acquired some very questionable VAX companies, but one had an outstanding relational DBMS. By then it was too late — the company's $50 million of cash had been spent.

In 1988, John Cullinane returned to Cullinet, fired Chapman and tried to salvage the company. By repositioning the company's product line with a new product called Enterprise Generator, he solved the open architecture problem and the company was able to return to profitability by the fourth quarter, which made it possible to negotiate a deal with Charles Wang, head of Computer Associates.

In 1989, Wang bought the company for $330 million in stock. It was a good deal for investors, which was reflected in the fact that shares of CA increased in value at least tenfold during the 1990s. It was a good deal for John Cullinane, too.

Much later, CA Technologies (formerly CA, Inc. and Computer Associates International, Inc.) still marketed and supported the CA IDMS relational database system for IBM z/OS, z/VSE and z/VM, Fujitsu Siemens BS2000/OSD, Linux (CA IDMS Server), UNIX (CA IDMS Server) and Windows (CA IDMS Server).

== Products ==
IDMS
A CODASYL network database management system first developed at B.F. Goodrich. John Cullinane acquired the rights to market IDMS in the early 1970s. IDMS legacy systems are still being run today. Only a few customers have migrated to IDMS/R.

IDMS/R
This was an evolution of IDMS in approximately 1984 involving the addition of relational features.

=== IDMS/SQL ===
This was a completely separate database engine developed in California by Dr. Kapali Eswaran who was originally from IBM's System R project. The company had also developed a 4GL for use with the database engine. The components were all named after planets. This product was designed to run on the Digital VAX system. Eswaron's company Esvel was acquired by Cullinet in July 1987 and its main product re-launched as IDMS/R. The 4GL was dropped in favour of one developed by a Cancor, a Canadian company based in Mississauga, Ontario which was acquired in January 1987.
IDMS-DC
A teleprocessing system similar to IBM's CICS system. When it was first released, it was reported that IBM challenged Cullinane to prove that the code had not violated copyright. This suspicion was due to the fact that many internal CICS codes begin with the initials "RH". Many IDMS-DC modules also begin with "RH" after it two authors, Nick Rini and Don Heitzmann, both employees of Cullinane.
ADS/Online
IDMS-DC help spawn a fourth generation (4GL) programming system called ADS/Online (Application Development System). The original name of the product was "AIDS". ADS/Online was a COBOL-like language and was successful because it competed against CICS, which tended to be used mainly by COBOL programmers. ADS/O was later ported to run directly in CICS and was adopted by nearly 1,500 companies.
ADS/Batch
A port of ADS/Online to the batch mainframe environment. It was not well received by Cullinet's customers.
