= Exclusive =

Exclusive may refer to:

== Arts and entertainment ==
- Exclusive (album), by Chris Brown
- Exclusive (film), a 1937 American film
- Exclusive, a 1989 play by Jeffrey Archer
- Exclusive (TV series), a 2008 Malaysian drama series
- "Exclusive", an episode of One Day at a Time (2017 TV series)

== Organisations ==
- Exclusive Books, a bookseller chain in South Africa
- Exclusive Hotels, a hotel chain based in Surrey, England
- Exclusive Records, an American record label from 1944 to 1949

== Other uses ==
- Exclusive relationship, a closed, committed relationship
- Exclusive (news), a news story reported by one organization before others
- Noah Boeken (born 1981), Dutch poker professional, online nickname "Exclusive"
- Exclusive (horse), a British Thoroughbred racehorse
- Exclusive OR, a type of logic gate

== See also ==
- The Exclusives (TV series), a 2012 British reality competition series
- Exclusive relationship (programming)
- Exclusion (disambiguation)
