= Rivoningo Mhlari =

South African businessman (born 1994)

- Born: Rivoningo Mhlari; 28 July 1994 (age 32); Phalaborwa, Limpopo, South Africa
- Education: University of Cape Town
- Occupation: Businessman
- Known for: Co-Founder, Rikatec (Pty) Limited
- Title: Chief Executive Officer at Rikatec
- Website: https://rikatec.co.za/

Rivoningo Mhlari (born 28 July 1994) is a South African businessman and co-founder of Rikatec (Pty) Limited.

The company creates an information management system for vehicles that provides real-time predictive maintenance for fleets, monitors driving habits, wear and tear and break detection and diagnosis.

Following the company's founding and growth, Rivoningo was listed among Forbes Africa's 30 Under 30.

In June 2018, Rivoningo was again listed as one of the 10 Young African Technology Entrepreneurs and as one of the 200 Young South Africans (Business and Entrepreneurship) in the Mail and Guardian.
