= Codicil =

Codicil may refer to:

- Codicil (will), subsequent change or modification of terms made and appended to an existing trust or will and testament
- A modification of terms made and appended to an existing constitution, treaty, or standard form contract
- Any addition or appendix, such as a corollary to a theorem

== See also ==
- CODASYL
