= Conceptual schema =

High-level database design model

A conceptual schema or conceptual data model is a high-level description of informational needs underlying the design of a database. It typically includes only the core concepts and the main relationships among them. This is a high-level model with insufficient detail to build a complete, functional database. It describes the structure of the whole database for a group of users. The conceptual model is also known as the data model that can be used to describe the conceptual schema when a database system is implemented. It hides the internal details of physical storage and targets the description of entities, datatypes, relationships and constraints.

== Overview ==
A conceptual schema is a map of concepts and their relationships used for databases. This describes the semantics of an organization and represents a series of assertions about its nature. Specifically, it describes the things of significance to an organization (entity classes), about which it is inclined to collect information, and their characteristics (attributes) and the associations between pairs of those things of significance (relationships).

Because a conceptual schema represents the semantics of an organization, and not a database design, it may exist on various levels of abstraction. The original ANSI four-schema architecture began with the set of external schemata that each represents one person's view of the world around him or her. These are consolidated into a single conceptual schema that is the superset of all of those external views. A data model can be as concrete as each person's perspective, but this tends to make it inflexible. If that person's world changes, the model must change. Conceptual data models take a more abstract perspective, identifying the fundamental things, of which the things an individual deals with are just examples.

The model does allow for what is called inheritance in object oriented terms. The set of instances of an entity class may be subdivided into entity classes in their own right. Thus, each instance of a subtype entity class is also an instance of the entity class's supertype. Each instance of the supertype entity class, then is also an instance of one of the subtype entity classes.

Supertype/subtype relationships may be exclusive or not. A methodology may require that each instance of a supertype may only be an instance of one subtype. Similarly, a supertype/subtype relationship may be exhaustive or not. It is exhaustive if the methodology requires that each instance of a supertype must be an instance of a subtype. A subtype named "Other" is often necessary.

== Example relationships ==
- Each person may be the vendor in one or more orders.
- Each order must be from one and only one person.
- "Person" is a subtype of "party". (Meaning that every instance of 'person' is also an instance of 'party'.)
- Each employee may have a supervisor who is also an employee.

== Data structure diagram ==
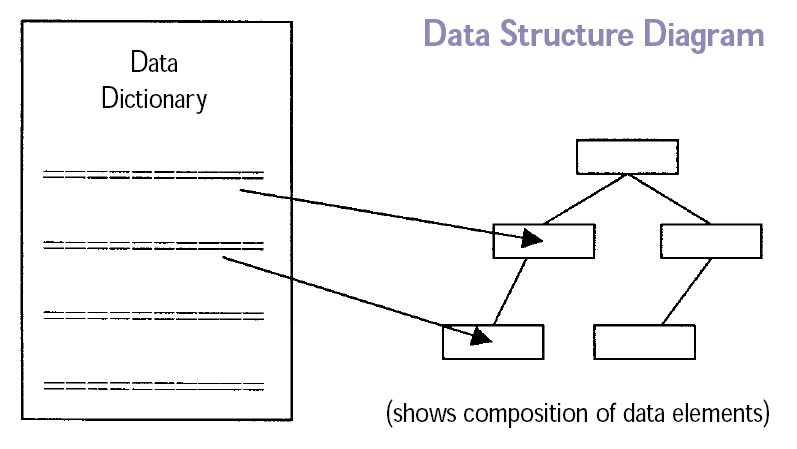
Data structure diagram and a data dictionary

A data structure diagram (DSD) is a data model or diagram used to describe conceptual data models by providing graphical notations which document entities and their relationships, and the constraints that bind them.

== See also ==
- Concept mapping – Diagram showing relationships among concepts
- Conceptual framework – Method of organizing information
- Conceptual graphs – Formalism for knowledge representation
- Conceptual model (computer science) – Model in software engineering
- Data modeling – Creating a model of the data in a system
- Entity–relationship model – Model or diagram describing interrelated things
- Object–relationship modeling – Programming technique
- Object–role modeling – Programming technique
- Knowledge representation – Field of artificial intelligence
- Logical data model – Representation of an organization's data
- Mindmap – Diagram to visually organize information
- Ontology – Specification of a conceptualization
- Physical data model – Representation of a data design
- Semantic Web – Extension of the Web to facilitate data exchange
- Three-schema approach – Approach to building information systems
