= Physical design =

Physical design can refer to

- Physical database design - see also Physical data model
- Physical design (electronics)
