= Mary K. Hawes =

Computer scientist

Mary K. Hawes was a computer scientist who identified the need for a common business language in accounting, which led to the development of COBOL. COBOL is short for Common Business Oriented Language. It was written to resemble ordinary English. They intended for the language to be portable to different brands of computers and that it be capable of calculations for business needs, such as payroll calculation. Edward Block specified in a 1959 report that:

[The] meeting was the result of a request by Mary K. Hawes (ElectroData Division, Burroughs Corporation) to plan a formal meeting involving both users and manufacturers where plans could be prepared to develop the specifications for a common business language for automatic digital computers.

She proposed this new language in March 1959, when she was working as a senior product planning analyst for the ElectroData Division of Burroughs Corporation. She approached Grace Hopper with the proposal, who suggested that they ask the U.S. Department of Defense (DOD) for funding. Charles Philips, an employee at the DOD, agreed and in May 1959 approximately 40 representatives of computer users and computer manufacturers met and formed the Short Range Committee of the Conference on Data Systems Languages (CODASYL).

Hawes chaired the data descriptions subcommittee in the Short-Range Committee, the team that was initially tasked with identifying problems with the current business compilers.

Hawes co-authored the books Optimized code generation from extended-entry decision tables published in September 1971, Feature analysis of generalized database management systems: CODASYL Systems Committee published in May 1971, and A survey of generalized database management systems published in May 1969.
