= Network model =

Database model invented by Charles Bachman

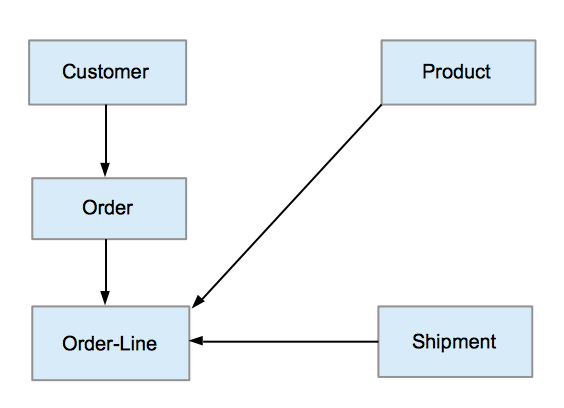
Bachman diagram of a simple network database

In computing, the network model is a database model conceived as a flexible way of representing objects and their relationships. Its distinguishing feature is that the schema, viewed as a graph in which object types are nodes and relationship types are arcs, is not restricted to being a hierarchy or lattice.

The network model was adopted by the CODASYL Data Base Task Group in 1969 and underwent a major update in 1971. It is sometimes known as the CODASYL model for this reason. A number of network database systems became popular on mainframe and minicomputers through the 1970s before being widely replaced by relational databases in the 1980s.

== Overview ==
While the hierarchical database model structures data as a tree of records, with each record having one parent record and many children, the network model allows each record to have multiple parent and child records, forming a generalized graph structure. This property applies at two levels: the schema is a generalized graph of record types connected by relationship types (called "set types" in CODASYL), and the database itself is a generalized graph of record occurrences connected by relationships (CODASYL "sets"). Cycles are permitted at both levels. Peer-to-Peer and Client Server are examples of Network Models.

The chief argument in favour of the network model, in comparison to the hierarchical model, was that it allowed a more natural modeling of relationships between entities. Although the model was widely implemented and used, it failed to become dominant for two main reasons. Firstly, IBM chose to stick to the hierarchical model with semi-network extensions in their established products such as IMS and DL/I. Secondly, it was eventually displaced by the relational model, which offered a higher-level, more declarative interface. Until the early 1980s the performance benefits of the low-level navigational interfaces offered by hierarchical and network databases were persuasive for many large-scale applications, but as hardware became faster, the extra productivity and flexibility of the relational model led to the gradual obsolescence of the network model in corporate enterprise usage.

== History ==
The network model's original inventor was Charles Bachman, and it was developed into a standard specification published in 1969 by the Conference on Data Systems Languages (CODASYL) Consortium. This was followed by a second publication in 1971, which became the basis for most implementations. Subsequent work continued into the early 1980s, culminating in an ISO specification, but this had little influence on products.

Bachman's influence is recognized in the term Bachman diagram, a diagrammatic notation that represents a database schema expressed using the network model. In a Bachman diagram, named rectangles represent record types, and arrows represent one-to-many relationship types between records (CODASYL set types).

== Database systems ==
Some well-known database systems that use the network model include:

- IMAGE for HP 3000
- Integrated Data Store (IDS)
- IDMS (Integrated Database Management System)
- Univac DMS-1100
- Norsk Data SIBAS
- Oracle CODASYL DBMS for OpenVMS (originally known as DEC VAX DBMS)

== See also ==
- Navigational database
- Graph database
