= Physical schema =

Representation of a data design

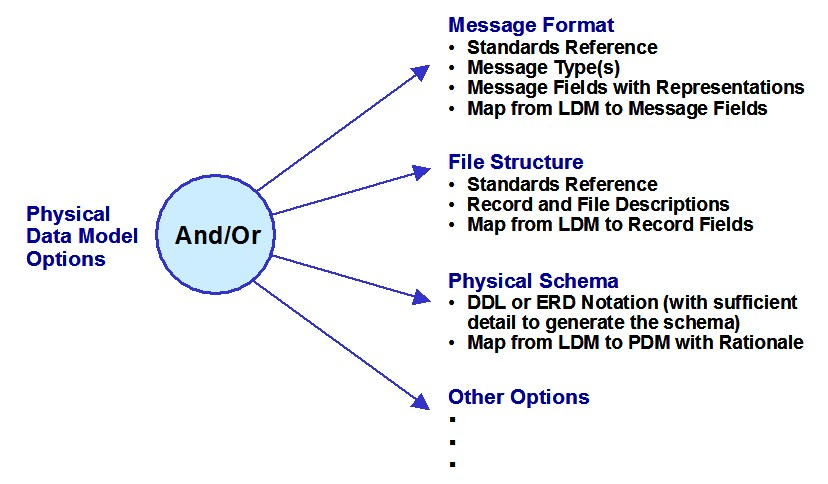
Physical data model options.

A physical data model (or database design) is a representation of a data design as implemented, or intended to be implemented, in a database management system. In the lifecycle of a project it typically derives from a logical data model, though it may be reverse-engineered from a given database implementation. A complete physical data model will include all the database artifacts required to create relationships between tables or to achieve performance goals, such as indexes, constraint definitions, linking tables, partitioned tables or clusters. Analysts can usually use a physical data model to calculate storage estimates; it may include specific storage allocation details for a given database system.

As of 2012 seven main databases dominate the commercial marketplace: Informix, Oracle, Postgres, SQL Server, Sybase, IBM Db2 and MySQL. Other RDBMS systems tend either to be legacy databases or used within academia such as universities or further education colleges. Physical data models for each implementation would differ significantly, not least due to underlying operating-system requirements that may sit underneath them. For example: SQL Server runs only on Microsoft Windows operating-systems (Starting with SQL Server 2017, SQL Server runs on Linux. It's the same SQL Server database engine, with many similar features and services regardless of your operating system), while Oracle and MySQL can run on Solaris, Linux and other UNIX-based operating-systems as well as on Windows. This means that the disk requirements, security requirements and many other aspects of a physical data model will be influenced by the RDBMS that a database administrator (or an organization) chooses to use.

== Physical schema ==
Physical schema is a term used in data management to describe how data is to be represented and stored (files, indices, etc.) in secondary storage using a particular database management system (DBMS) (e.g., Oracle RDBMS, Sybase SQL Server, etc.).

In the ANSI/SPARC Architecture three schema approach, the internal schema is the view of data that involves data management technology. This is as opposed to an external schema that reflects an individual's view of the data, or the conceptual schema that is the integration of a set of external schemas.

The logical schema was the way data were represented to conform to the constraints of a particular approach to database management. At that time the choices were hierarchical and network. Describing the logical schema, however, still did not describe how physically data would be stored on disk drives. That is the domain of the physical schema. Now logical schemas describe data in terms of relational tables and columns, object-oriented classes, and XML tags.

A single set of tables, for example, can be implemented in numerous ways, up to and including an architecture where table rows are maintained on computers in different countries.

== See also ==
- Database schema
- Conceptual data model
- Logical data model
