= Integrated Data Store =

Early data base management system

- Developer: Charles Bachman
- Release: 1964
- Type: Network DBMS
- License: Commercial

Integrated Data Store (IDS) was an early network database management system largely used by industry, known for its high performance. IDS became the basis for the CODASYL Data Base Task Group standards.

IDS was designed in the 1960s at the computer division of General Electric (which later became Honeywell Information Systems) by Charles Bachman, who received the Turing Award from the Association for Computing Machinery for its creation, in 1973. The software was released in 1964 for the GE 235 computer. By 1965, a network version for the customer Weyerhaeuser Lumber was in operation.

IDS/II, introduced in 1975, was a chargeable program product. At this time the original version was labeled IDS/I.

It was not easy to use or implement applications with IDS, because it was designed to maximize performance using the hardware available at that time. However, that weakness was equally its strength because skilful implementations of IDS-type databases, such as British Telecom's huge CSS project (an IDMS database servicing more than 10 billion transactions per year), show levels of performance on terabyte-sized databases that are unmatchable by all relational database implementations. Charles Bachman's innovative design work continues to find state-of-the-art application with major commercial operations.

Later, BF Goodrich Chemical Co. rewrote the entire system to make it more usable, calling the result integrated data management system (IDMS).

== See also ==
- Navigational Database
