= Kapali Eswaran =

Computer developer

Kapali P. Eswaran is one of the founding members of the IBM System R Project, which formed the genesis of relational database technology.

Eswaran is a graduate of Stanford University and University of California, Berkeley. He was an architect of IBM System R, the precursor to DB2. Eswaran was one of the inventors of SQL language. The Eswaran principle relating to database locking and transactions is a contribution that he made along with Jim Gray and Irv Traiger while working as a scientist at IBM Research. Subsequently, he launched Esvel, Inc. (acquired by Cullinet Software in 1987 for 30+ million, which itself was acquired by Computer Associates which then was acquired by Bradcom) and Kaps Corporation (technology acquired by subsidiary of BP, Hewlett-Packard and by Carlysle Library Systems). He is currently the CEO of Integrated Informatics Inc.

Eswaran pursued his career primarily working as a researcher and software designer IBM Research where he contributed to several major database and transaction processing systems, including the System-R. He was founder and CEO of Esvel, Inc. and Integrated Informatics Inc.. Integrated Informatics was committed to digital transformation of Healthcare.
