= Exclusion =

Exclusion may refer to:

== Legal or regulatory ==
- Exclusion zone, a geographic area in which some sanctioning authority prohibits specific activities
- Exclusion Crisis and Exclusion Bill, a 17th-century attempt to ensure a Protestant succession in England
- Exclusionary rule, a US legal principle
- Tax exclusion, classes of income excluded from taxable income bases; see tax exemption

== Other uses ==
- Social exclusion, state of being socially disadvantaged, marginalized, relegated to the fringe of society, or banished
- Diagnosis of exclusion, medical diagnosis by the process of elimination
- Expulsion (education), permanent exclusion (i.e., permanent suspension) from a school or university, usually punitively
- Temporary exclusion, or suspension from school
- Clusivity, a linguistic concept

== See also ==
- Outcast (person)
- Transclusion, the inclusion of part or all of an electronic document into one or more other documents by hypertext reference
