= Charles Bachman =

American computer scientist

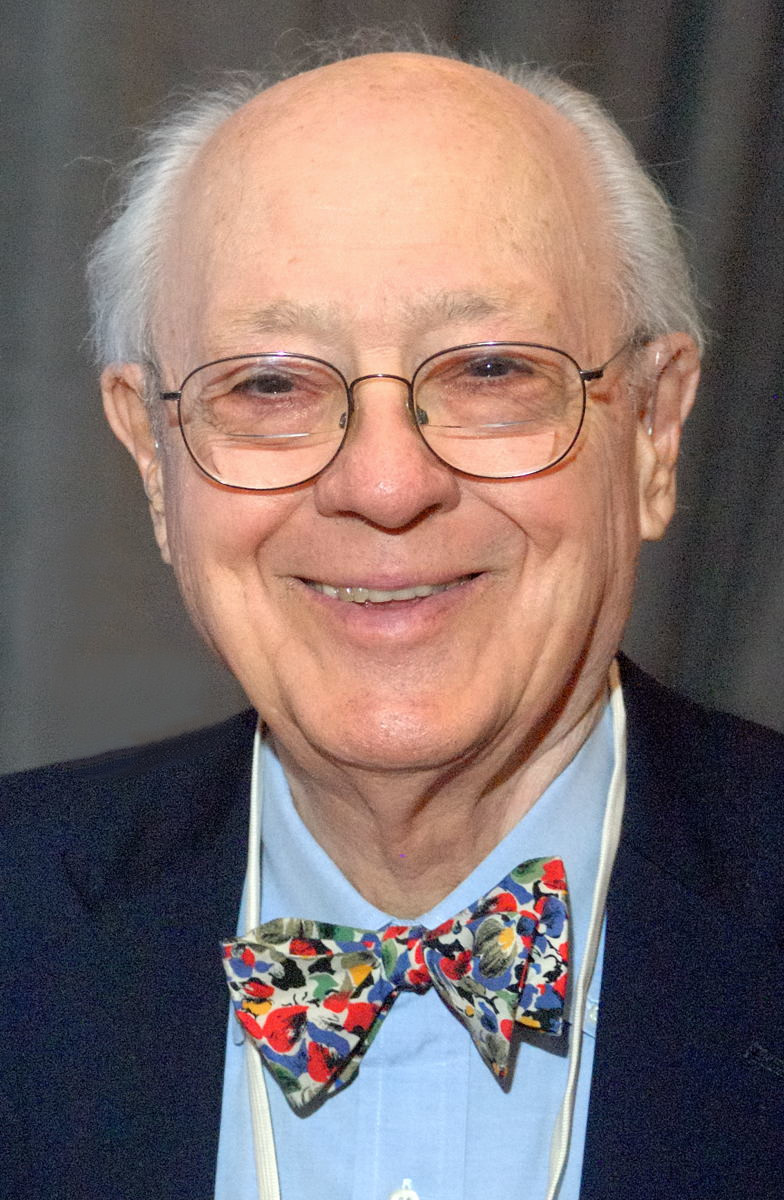
- Bachman in 2012
- Born: Charles William Bachman III; December 11, 1924; Manhattan, Kansas, U.S.
- Died: July 13, 2017 (aged 92); Lexington, Massachusetts, U.S.
- Education: University of Pennsylvania (BS); Michigan State University (MS)
- Known for: Integrated Data Store
- Awards: Turing Award (1973); National Medal of Technology and Innovation (2012); ACM Fellow (2014)
- Scientific career
- Fields: Computer science
- Workplaces: Dow Chemical; General Electric; Cullinet; Bachman Information Systems

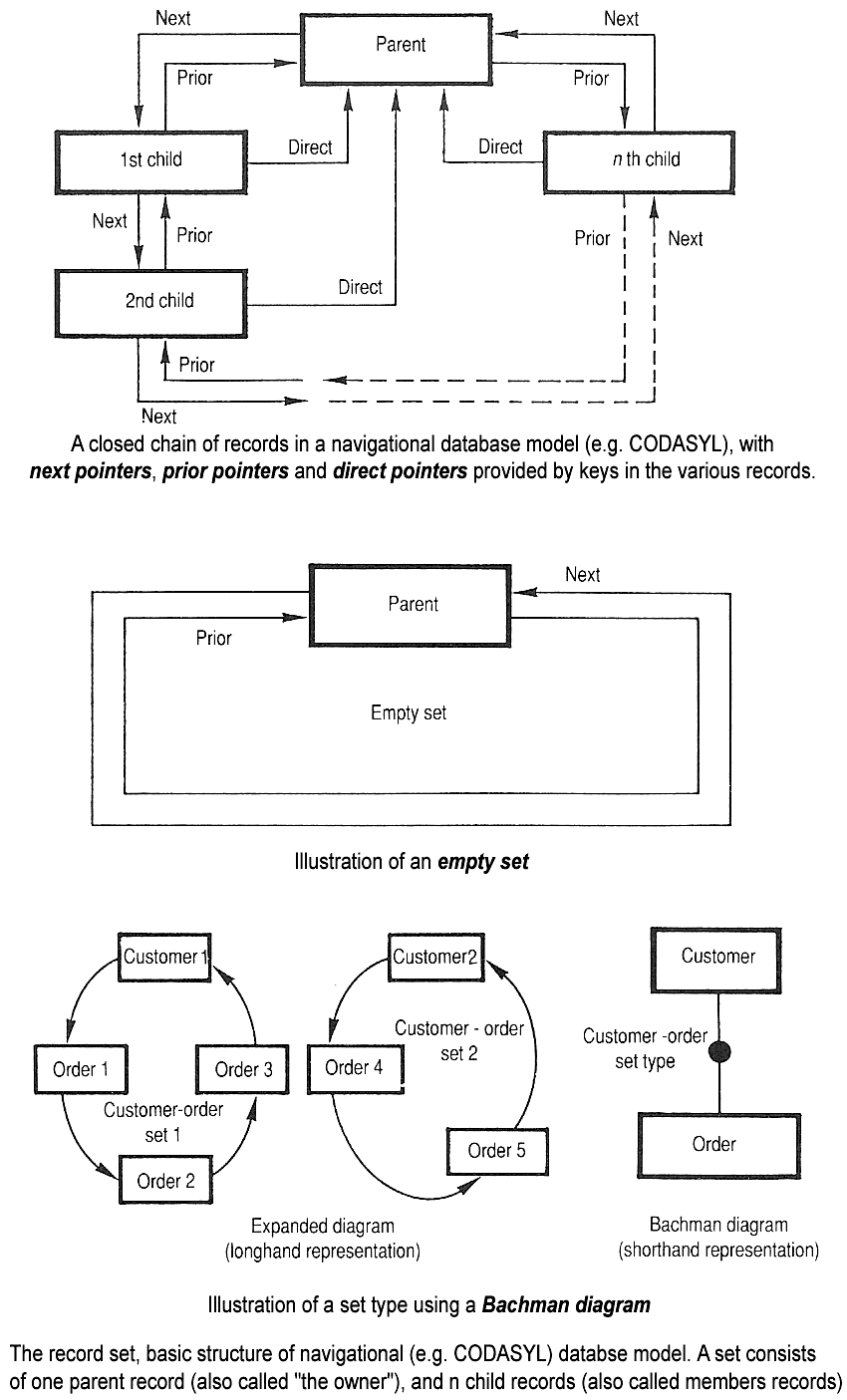
Basic structure of navigational CODASYL database model

Charles William Bachman III (December 11, 1924 – July 13, 2017) was an American computer scientist, who spent his entire career as an industrial researcher, developer, and manager rather than in academia. He was particularly known for his work in the early development of database management systems. His techniques of layered architecture include his namesake Bachman diagrams. He won the 1973 ACM Turing Award.

== Biography ==
Charles Bachman was born in Manhattan, Kansas, in 1924, where his father, Charles Bachman Jr., was the head football coach at Kansas State College. He attended high school in East Lansing, Michigan, where his father served as head football coach at Michigan State College from 1933 to 1946.

In World War II he joined the United States Army and spent March 1944 through February 1946 in the South West Pacific Theater serving in the Anti-Aircraft Artillery Corps in New Guinea, Australia, and the Philippine Islands. There he was first exposed to and used fire control computers for aiming 90 mm guns.

After his discharge in 1946 he attended Michigan State College and graduated in 1948 with a bachelor's degree in mechanical engineering, where he was a member of Tau Beta Pi. In mid-1949, he married Connie Hadley.

He then attended the University of Pennsylvania. In 1950, he graduated with a master's degree in mechanical engineering, and had also completed three-quarters of the requirements for an MBA from the university's Wharton School.

Bachman died on July 13, 2017, at his home in Lexington, Massachusetts, of Parkinson's disease at the age of 92.

== Career ==
Bachman spent his entire career as a practicing software engineer or manager in industry rather than in academia. In 1950, he started working at Dow Chemical in Midland, Michigan.

In 1957, he became Dow's first data processing manager. He worked with the IBM user group SHARE on developing a new version of report generator software, which became known as 9PAC. However, the planned IBM 709 order was cancelled before it arrived.

In 1960, he joined General Electric, where by 1963 he developed the Integrated Data Store (IDS), one of the first database management systems using what came to be known as the navigational database model, in the Manufacturing Information And Control System (MIACS) product.

Working for customer Weyerhaeuser Lumber, he developed the first multiprogramming network access to the IDS database, an early online transaction processing system called WEYCOS in 1965.

Later, at GE, he developed the "dataBasic" product that offered database support to Basic language timesharing users. In 1970, GE sold its computer business to Honeywell Information Systems, so he and his family moved from Phoenix, Arizona to Lexington, Massachusetts.

In 1981, he joined a smaller firm, Cullinane Information Systems (later Cullinet), which offered a version of IDS that was called IDMS and supported IBM mainframes.

=== Bachman Information Systems ===
In 1983, he founded Bachman Information Systems, which developed a line of computer-aided software engineering (CASE) products. The centerpiece of these products was the BACHMAN/Data Analyst, which provided graphic support to the creation and maintenance of Bachman Diagrams. It was featured in IBM's Reengineering Cycle marketing program, combining:

1. the reverse engineering of obsolete mainframe databases,
2. data modeling,
3. forward engineering to new physical databases, and
4. optimization of physical database designs for performance and DBMS specifics.

In 1991 Bachman Information Systems had their initial public offering, trading on the NASDAQ with the symbol BACH. After reaching a high of $37.75 in February 1992, the price hit $1.75 in 1995. In 1996, his company merged with Cadre Technology to form Cayenne Software. He served as president of the combined company for a year, and then retired to Tucson, Arizona. He continued to serve as chairman of the board of Cayenne, which was acquired by Sterling Software in 1998.

== Awards ==
- Bachman received the Turing Award from the Association for Computing Machinery (ACM) in 1973 for "his outstanding contributions to database technology".
- He was elected as a Distinguished Fellow of the British Computer Society in 1977 for his pioneering work in database systems.
- In 2012, Bachman was awarded a National Medal of Technology and Innovation "for fundamental inventions in database management, transaction processing, and software engineering."
- He was named an ACM Fellow in 2014 “For contributions to database technology, notably the integrated data store”.
- In 2015, he was made a Fellow of the Computer History Museum for his early work on developing database systems.

== Publications ==
Bachman published dozens of publications and papers. A selection:

- 1962. "Precedence Diagrams: The Key to Production Planning, Scheduling and Control." In: ProCo Features. Supplement No 24, August 24. .
- 1965. "Integrated Data Store." in: DPMA Quarterly, January 1965.
- 1969. "Software for Random Access Processing." in: Datamation April 1965.
- 1969. "Data Structure Diagrams." in: DataBase: A Quarterly Newsletter of SIGBDP. vol. 1, no. 2, Summer 1969.
- 1972. "Architecture Definition Technique: Its Objectives, Theory, Process, Facilities, and Practice." co-authored with J. Bouvard. in: Data Description, Access and Control: Proceedings of the 1972 ACM-SIGFIDET Workshop, November 29-December 1, 1972.
- 1972. "The Evolution of Storage Structures." In: Communications of the ACM vol. 15, no. 7, July 1972.
- 1972-73. "Set Concept for Data Structure." In: Encyclopedia of Computer Science, 1972–1973.
- 1973. "The Programmer as Navigator." 1973 ACM Turing Award lecture. In: Communications of the ACM vol. 16, no. 11, November 1973. (pdf)
- 1974. "Implementation Techniques for Data Structure Sets." In: Data Base Management Systems, 1974.
- 1977. "Why Restrict the Modeling Capability of Codasyl Data Structure Sets?" In: National Computer Conference vol. 46, 1977.
- 1978. "Commentary on the CODASYL Systems Committee's Interim Report on Distributed Database Technology." National Computer Conference vol. 47, 1978.
- 1978. "DDP Will Be Infinitely Affected, So Managers Beware!" in: DM, March 1978.
- 1980. "The Impact of Structured Data Throughout Computer-Based Information Systems." In: Information Processing 80, 1980.
- 1980. "The Role Data Model Approach to Data Structures." In; International Conference on Data Bases, March 24, 1980.
- 1982. "Toward a More Complete Reference Model of Computer-Based Information Systems." Co-authored with Ronald G. Ross. In: Computers and Standards 1, 1982.
- 1983. "The Structuring Capabilities of the Molecular Data Model." In; Entity-Relationship Approach to Software Engineering. C. G. Davis, S. Jajodia, and R. T. Yeh. eds. June 1983.
- 1987. "A Case for Adaptable Programming." In: Logic vol. 2, no. 1, Spring 1987.
- 1989. "A Personal Chronicle: Creating Better Information Systems, with Some Guiding Principles." In: IEEE Transactions on Knowledge and Data Engineering vol. 1, no. 1, March 1989.

After his retirement, Bachman volunteered to help record the history of early software development. In 2002 he gave a lecture at the Computer History Museum on assembling the Integrated Data Store, and an oral history for the ACM in 2004. Bachman papers from 1951 to 2007 are available from the Charles Babbage Institute at the University of Minnesota. In 2011, he contributed an oral history to the Institute of Electrical and Electronics Engineers.

== See also ==
- Bachman diagram
- Navigational database
- List of pioneers in computer science
