= Data Language Interface =

Data Language One (Data Language/I, DL/I, Data Language/One, Data Language/One) is the language system used to access IBM's IMS databases and its data communication system.

It is implemented from many languages by making calls to a software stub, DFSLI000. This stub has entry points to handle a variety of programming languages, e.g., calling CBLTDLI from a COBOL program. This stub is linked to the calling program, passes on the request to the IMS system, and returns the results and a status code.

In any full-function IMS database, the smallest element that can be retrieved is a segment. Each segment is made up of fields, one of which, typically, will be a key field. The segments are arranged hierarchically in the database, the highest-level segment type being a root segment. 255 different segment types, on up to 15 levels, are allowed in any database. A database record consists of a specific root segment and all its dependent child segments – there is no limit to the number of segments in a record, or to the number of records in a database (apart from the physical limitations of storage space).

The structure of any database is presented to the application program as a PCB (Program Communication Block), and this is used as one of the parameters passed to the stub. Other types of PCB are used to send and receive transaction processing messages, access and write to the user’s VDU screen, and to print reports, etc.

When accessing a database segment, the application program also uses an SSA (Segment Search Argument) as a parameter, to specify the segment or segments that it needs. This would typically contain the segment type required and the contents of any key fields.

For all languages except PL/I, the first parameter in a call is the Function Code – a four-character field, examples being: “GU ” (Get Unique), “GN ” (Get Next), “REPL” (Replace), and “ISRT” (Insert). With PL/I, due to the way this language does not mark the last parameter with a '1' in bit 0, the first parameter must instead be a fullword (Fixed Bin(31)) containing the number of following parameters.

A typical call from a COBOL program might be CALL “CBLTDLI” USING GU, Stores-Database-PCB, Stores-Segment-Area, Stores-Root-SSA. The program would then automatically wait till the requested data were retrieved and placed in the Segment-Area. The status code contained within the PCB would be updated with either blanks (if all went well) or some informational or error code.

A typical call from a PL/I program might be CALL PLITDLI(FOUR, GU, Stores-Database-PCB, Stores-Segment-Area, Stores-Root-SSA);.
