= Exclusive relationship (programming) =

In computing, an exclusive relationship is a type of Relationship in computer data base design.

In Relational Database Design, in some cases the existence of one kind of relationship type precludes the existence of another. Entities within an entity type A may be related by a relationship type R to an entity in entity type B or entity type C but not both. The relationship types are said to be mutually exclusive. Usually, both relationship types will have the same name.

== Example ==
A Data (Entity A) could be Sent (Relationship Name) to a Monitor (Entity B) or a Printer (Entity C) to be shown. In this case, the relationship between the Monitor and Printer at one side and Data at the other side is an Exclusive Relationship. Of course it is assumed that Data could be sent to only one of the targets at a time, not to both.

     --- Sent_To ---> Monitor
 Data 
     --- Sent_To ---> Printer
