= Hierarchical database model =

Tree-like structure for data

Hierarchical database model

A hierarchical database model is a data model in which the data is organized into a tree-like structure. The data are stored as records which is a collection of one or more fields. Each field contains a single value, and the collection of fields in a record defines its type. One type of field is the link, which connects a given record to associated records. Using links, records link to other records, and to other records, forming a tree. An example is a "customer" record that has links to that customer's "orders", which in turn link to "line_items".

The hierarchical database model mandates that each child record has only one parent, whereas each parent record can have zero or more child records. The network model extends the hierarchical by allowing multiple parents and children. In order to retrieve data from these databases, the whole tree needs to be traversed starting from the root node. Both models were well suited to data that was normally stored on tape drives, which had to move the tape from end to end in order to retrieve data.

When the relational database model emerged, one criticism of hierarchical database models was their close dependence on application-specific implementation. This limitation, along with the relational model's ease of use, contributed to the popularity of relational databases, despite their initially lower performance in comparison with the existing network and hierarchical models.

== History ==
The hierarchical structure was developed by IBM in the 1960s and used in early mainframe DBMS. Records' relationships form a treelike model. This structure is simple but inflexible because the relationship is confined to a one-to-many relationship. The IBM Information Management System (IMS) and RDM Mobile are examples of a hierarchical database system with multiple hierarchies over the same data.

The hierarchical data model lost traction as Codd's relational model became the de facto standard used by virtually all mainstream database management systems. A relational-database implementation of a hierarchical model was first discussed in published form in 1992 (see also nested set model). Hierarchical data organization schemes resurfaced with the advent of XML in the late 1990s (see also XML database). The hierarchical structure is used primarily today for storing geographic information and file systems.

Currently, hierarchical databases are still widely used especially in applications that require very high performance and availability such as banking, health care, and telecommunications. One of the most widely used commercial hierarchical databases is IMS. Another example of the use of hierarchical databases is Windows Registry in the Microsoft Windows operating systems.

== Examples of hierarchical data represented as relational tables ==
An organization could store employee information in a table that contains attributes/columns such as employee number, first name, last name, and department number. The organization provides each employee with computer hardware as needed, but computer equipment may only be used by the employee to which it is assigned. The organization could store the computer hardware information in a separate table that includes each part's serial number, type, and the employee that uses it. The tables might look like this:

employee table
EmpNo	First Name	Last Name	Dept. Num
100	Sally	Baker	10-L
101	Jack	Douglas	10-L
102	Sarah	Schultz	20-B
103	David	Drachmeier	20-B

computer table
Serial Num	Type	User EmpNo
3009734-4	Computer	100
3-23-283742	Monitor	100
2-22-723423	Monitor	100
232342	Printer	100

In this model, the employee data table represents the "parent" part of the hierarchy, while the computer table represents the "child" part of the hierarchy. In contrast to tree structures usually found in computer software algorithms, in this model the children point to the parents. As shown, each employee may possess several pieces of computer equipment, but each individual piece of computer equipment may have only one employee owner.

Consider the following structure:

EmpNo	Designation	ReportsTo
10	Director	
20	Senior Manager	10
30	Typist	20
40	Programmer	20

In this, the "child" is the same type as the "parent". The hierarchy stating EmpNo 10 is boss of 20, and 30 and 40 each report to 20 is represented by the "ReportsTo" column. In Relational database terms, the ReportsTo column is a foreign key referencing the EmpNo column. If the "child" data type were different, it would be in a different table, but there would still be a foreign key referencing the EmpNo column of the employees table.

This simple model is commonly known as the adjacency list model and was introduced by Dr. Edgar F. Codd after initial criticisms surfaced that the relational model could not model hierarchical data. However, the model is only a special case of a general adjacency list for a graph.

== See also ==
- Tree structure
- Hierarchical query
- Hierarchical clustering
