= Comparison of data modeling tools =

Comparison of notable data modeling tools

This article lists notable data modeling tools and summarizes their features.

== Data modeling tools ==
Tool	Creator	Target Business Size	License	Supported Database Platforms	Supported OSs	Standalone or bundled into a larger toolkit	Launch Date
Astah Professional	Change Vision, Inc.	Enterprises, SMBs, personal	Proprietary	Any database with a JDBC driver (import via the DB Reverse plug-in); SQL-92 DDL export	Windows, macOS, Linux	Standalone	2009 (before this date known as JUDE/Professional)
Database Workbench	Upscene Productions	SMBs and enterprises	Proprietary	MS SQL Server, MySQL, Oracle, Firebird, InterBase, SQL Anywhere, NexusDB, MariaDB	Windows, Linux and FreeBSD (both through Wine)	Standalone	2001
DbSchema	Wise Coders GmbH	SMBs and enterprises	Proprietary	MS SQL Server, MySQL, Oracle, Firebird, InterBase, SQL Anywhere, NexusDB, MariaDB, SQLite, PostgreSQL, Sybase	Windows, Linux, macOS	Standalone	2018
Enterprise Architect	Sparx Systems	SMBs and enterprises	Proprietary	IBM Db2, Firebird, InterBase, Informix, Ingres, Access, MS SQL Server, MySQL, SQLite, Oracle, PostgreSQL, Sybase	Windows, Linux (Wine), macOS (via CrossOver)	Data modeling is supported as part of a complete modeling platform.	2000
ER/Studio	Embarcadero (acquired by IDERA)	SMBs and enterprises	Proprietary	Access, Snowflake, Microsoft Azure IBM Db2, Informix, Hitachi HiRDB, Firebird, Interbase, MySQL, MS SQL Server, Netezza, Oracle, PostgreSQL, Sybase, Teradata, Visual Foxpro and others via ODBC/ANSI SQL	Windows	Standalone	1998
Erwin Data Modeler	Logic Works (now Quest)	SMBs and enterprises	Proprietary	Access, IBM Db2, Informix, MySQL, MS SQL Server, Netezza, Oracle, PostgreSQL, Sybase, and others via ODBC/ANSI SQL	Windows	Standalone	1998
MagicDraw	No Magic	Enterprises, SMBs, personal	Proprietary	MS SQL Server, Oracle, MySQL, PostgreSQL, IBM Db2	Windows, Linux, macOS	Standalone	1995
ModelRight	ModelRight	Enterprises, SMBs, personal	Proprietary	Access, MS SQL Server, Oracle, MySQL, PostgreSQL, IBM Db2	Windows	Standalone	2005
MongoDB Compass	MongoDB, Inc.	Enterprise, SMBs, Personal	Server Side Public License	Any MongoDB Server (Atlas, Localhost, EA, Community, etc.)	Linux (64-bit), Windows (64-bit), Mac OS (64-bit)	Standalone or bundled into a larger toolkit	2015
MySQL Workbench	MySQL (An Oracle Company)	SMBs - personal	Proprietary or GPL	MySQL	Linux, Windows, macOS	Standalone	2006
Navicat Data Modeler	PremiumSoft	SMBs and enterprises	Proprietary	MySQL, MS SQL Server, PostgreSQL, Oracle, SQLite	Windows, macOS, Linux	Standalone	2012
NORMA Object-Role Modeling	Terry Halpin	SMBs and enterprises	Open source (CPL)	MySQL, MS SQL Server, PostgreSQL, Oracle, IBM Db2	Windows	Visual Studio Extension	2005
Open ModelSphere	Grandite	Enterprises - SMBs - personal	Open source (GNU GPL3)	MS SQL Server, MySQL, PostgreSQL, Oracle, IBM Db2	Windows, macOS, Linux	Standalone with Data, UML, and process modeling	2008
Oracle SQL Developer Data Modeler	Oracle	Enterprises	Proprietary	Oracle, MS SQL Server, IBM Db2	Cross-platform	Standalone	2009
PowerDesigner	SAP	SMBs and enterprises	Proprietary	Access, Greenplum, Apache Hive, HP Neoview, IBM Db2, Informix, Ingres, Interbase, MySQL, Netezza, NonStop SQL, Oracle, PostgreSQL, Red Brick Warehouse, SAP business Suite, SAP Hana, SAP Adaptive Server Enterprise, SAP IQ, SAP SQL Anywhere, MS SQL Server, Teradata	Windows	Standalone	1989
Software Ideas Modeler	Dusan Rodina	Enterprises, SMBs, personal	Proprietary	MS SQL Server, MySQL	Windows	Standalone	2009
SQLServer Management Studio	Microsoft	Unknown	Proprietary	MS SQL Server	Windows	Standalone	2005
SQLyog	Webyog, Inc.	Enterprises, SMBs, personal	Proprietary	MySQL, MariaDB	Windows and Linux (using Wine)	Standalone	2001
Toad Data Modeler	Quest Software	SMBs and enterprises	Proprietary	Access, IBM Db2, Informix, MySQL, MariaDB, PostgreSQL, MS SQL Server, SQLite, Oracle	Windows	Standalone	2005 (before this date known as CaseStudio)
Tool	Creator	Target Business Size	License	Supported Database Platforms	Supported OSs	Standalone or bundled into a larger toolkit	Launch Date

== Features of each modeling tool ==
Tool	Supported data models (conceptual, logical, physical)	Supported notations	Forward engineering	Reverse engineering	Model/database comparison and synchronization	Teamwork/repository
Astah Professional	Logical and physical names	IDEF1X, IE (Crow’s foot)	Yes	Yes (via plug-in)	No	File locking and project file merge
Database Workbench	Conceptual, logical, physical	IE (Crow’s foot)	Yes	Yes	Update database and/or update model	No
Enterprise Architect	Conceptual, Logical & Physical + MDA Transform of Logical to Physical	IDEF1X, UML DDL, Information Engineering & ERD	Yes	Yes	Update database and/or update model	Multi-user collaboration using File, DBMS or Cloud Repository (or transfer via XMI, CVS/TFS or Difference Merge).
ER/Studio	Logical, physical, ETL	IDEF1X, IE (Crow’s feet)	Yes	Yes	Update database and/or update model	ER/Studio Repository and Team Server (formerly Portal/CONNECT) for web based publishing collaboration and model management, with Business Glossary as standard.
MagicDraw	Conceptual, Logical & Physical + MDA Transform of Logical to Physical	IDEF1X, UML DDL, Information Engineering & ERD	Yes	Yes	Update database and/or update model	Multi-user collaboration using File, DBMS or (transfer via XMI, CVS/TFS or Difference Merge).
MySQL Workbench	Physical	IDEF1X, IE (Crow’s feet), UML, and more	Yes	Yes	Update database and/or update model	No
Navicat Data Modeler	Conceptual, Logical & Physical	IE (Crow’s foot)	Yes	Yes	Update database and/or update model	No
NORMA Object-Role modeling	Conceptual (ORM), Logical, Physical	ORM, Relational(Crow’s foot option), Barker	Yes	Yes	Update database and/or update model	No
Open ModelSphere	Conceptual, Logical, physical	IDEF1X, IE (Crow’s foot), and more	Yes	Yes	Update database and/or update model	No
Oracle SQL Developer Data Modeler	Logical, physical	Barker, IE (Crow’s foot), and Bachman	Yes	Yes	Update database and/or update model	Yes
PowerDesigner	Conceptual, logical, physical	IDEF1X, IE (Crow’s foot), and more	Yes	Yes	Update database and/or update model	Yes
Software Ideas Modeler	Conceptual, logical, physical	IDEF1X, IE (Crow’s foot), UML and more	Yes	Yes	Update database and/or update model	Yes
Toad Data Modeler	Logical, physical	IDEF1X, IE (Crow’s foot), and more	Yes	Yes	Update database and/or update model	Yes

== See also ==
- Comparison of database administration tools
- List of Unified Modeling Language tools
- Data modeling
- IDEF1X
