= PowerDesigner =

Collaborative enterprise modelling software tool

SAP PowerDesigner (and SAP Sybase PowerAMC)
- Original author(s): Xiao-Yun Wang
- Developer(s): SAP
- Stable release: 16.7 / April 2020; 5 years ago
- Operating system: Microsoft Windows
- Available in: English (PowerAMC: French)
- License: proprietary
- Website: www.sap.com

SAP PowerDesigner (or PowerDesigner) is a collaborative enterprise modelling tool produced by Sybase, currently owned by SAP. It can run either under Microsoft Windows as a native application or in an Eclipse environment through a plugin. It supports model-driven architecture software design, and stores models using a variety of file extensions, such as .bpm, .cdm and .pdm. The internal file structure can be either XML or a compressed binary file format. It can also store models in a database repository.

The PowerDesigner data modeling tool's market share in 2002 was 39%. It is priced from US$3,000 to $7,500 per developer seat.

== Features ==
PowerDesigner includes support for:

- Business Process Modeling (ProcessAnalyst) supporting BPMN
- Code generation (Java, C#, VB .NET, Hibernate, EJB3, NHibernate, JSF, WinForm (.NET and .NET CF), PowerBuilder, ...)
- Data modeling (works with most major RDBMS systems)
- Data Warehouse Modeling (WarehouseArchitect)
- Eclipse plugin
- Object modeling (UML 2.0 diagrams)
- Report generation
- Supports Simul8 to add simulation functions to the BPM module to enhance business processes design.
- Repository It refers to a repository of models (enterprise, information, data).
- Requirements analysis
- XML Modeling supporting XML Schema and DTD standards
- Visual Studio 2005 / 2008 addin

== History ==
PowerDesigner started life as AMC*Designor in France and S-Designor internationally, which was written by Xiao-Yun Wang of SDP Technologies. The "or" in the product name refers to "Oracle", since initially the product was developed to design Oracle databases, but very quickly evolved to support all major RDBMS in the market. SDP Technologies was a French company that was started in 1983. Powersoft purchased SDP in 1995, and Sybase had purchased Powersoft earlier in 1994. Shortly after the acquisition, the product was renamed to be consistent with the Powersoft brand. Sybase currently owns all rights to PowerDesigner and PowerAMC (the French version of PowerDesigner). In May 2010, SAP announced that it would be acquiring Sybase for $5.8 billion.

The data modeling features of the French and English editions were originally following 2 different methodologies: Merise for PowerAMC and information technology engineering (based on Yourdon / DeMarco works) for PowerDesigner. Since version 7, both editions support all methodologies and only differ from their user language. From v16.6 onwards, both editions are called PowerDesigner and are delivered in a single installer.

=== Version History ===
- 1989 - The first commercial release of AMC*Designor (version 2.0) in France
- 1992 - The first commercial release of S-Designer in the US.
- 1994 - ProcessAnalyst was added to the suite in 1994.
- 1995 - S-Designer becomes PowerDesigner, AMC*Designor becomes PowerAMC
- 1997 - PowerDesigner 6.0 releases.
- 1998 - WarehouseArchitect was added.
- 1999 - PowerDesigner 7.0 was rewritten to take advantage of newer technologies and to provide an interface more consistent with other Sybase products.
- December 2001 - PowerDesigner 9.5 was initially released, with maintenance releases through 2003.
- December 2004 - Version 10.0 (Minerva release)
- 2005 - Version 11.0
- January 2006 - PowerDesigner 12.0 released with metadata mappings and reporting features
- August 2006 - PowerDesigner 12.1 released with enhanced support for Microsoft Visual Studio and SQL Server
- July 2007 - PowerDesigner 12.5 released with new ETL (Extract, transform, load) and EII (Enterprise Information Integration) modeling and full UML 2.0 diagrams support
- October 2008 - PowerDesigner 15.0 released with new Enterprise Architecture Model, customizable frameworks support (Zachman Framework, FEAF, ...), Impact and Lineage Analysis Diagram, logical data model, Barker's Notation, Project support and lot more
- November 2011 - PowerDesigner 16.0 released with new Shell, Role-based UI, Glossary, Impact analysis on the repository, Sybase IQ reference architecture wizard, New database support, Web portal enhancements
- January 2013 - PowerDesigner 16.5 released with new features supporting SAP Platform: SAP HANA, SAP BusinessObjects, SAP Netweaver and SAP Solution Manager
- March 2016 - PowerDesigner 16.6 released with Support for SAP HANA Calculation Views and SAP HANA Core Data Services (CDS). PowerDesigner Web can now edit Enterprise Architecture and Requirements Models.
- April 2020 - PowerDesigner 16.7 released with new features supporting: Export from Web privilege, Limit the choice of model types offered in New Model dialog, New models added, Customize link symbol labels, Generate Models using the CSN notation, OAuth 2.0 Client Credentials authentication

== Standards ==
PowerDesigner supports the following standards:

- BPEL4WS
- Business Process Modeling Notation (BPMN)
- Document Type Definition (DTD)
- ebXML
- IDEF
- IE/Information engineering
- Merise
- RDBMS
- Rich Text Format (RTF)
- UML 2.0 diagrams
- XML
- XML Schema

== See also ==
- Comparison of data modeling tools
