= One-to-many (data model) =

Relationship between entities

In systems analysis, a one-to-many relationship is a type of cardinality that refers to the relationship between two entities (see also entity–relationship model). For example, take a car and an owner of the car. The car can only be owned by one owner at a time or not owned at all, and an owner could own zero, one, or multiple cars. One owner could have many cars, one-to-many.

In a relational database, a one-to-many relationship exists when one record is related to many records of another table. A one-to-many relationship is not a property of the data, but rather of the relationship itself. One-to-many often refer to a primary key to foreign key relationship between two tables, where the record in the first table can relate to multiple records in the second table. A foreign key is one side of the relationship that shows a row or multiple rows, with one of those rows being the primary key already listed on the first table. This is also called a foreign key constraint, which is important to keep data from being duplicated and have relationships within the database stay reliable as more information is added.

Many-to-many relationships are not able to be used in relational databases and must be converted to one-to-many relationships. Both one-to-many and one-to-one relationships are common in relational databases.

The opposite of one-to-many is many-to-one. The transpose of a one-to-many relationship is a many-to-one relationship.

== Entity relationship diagram (ERD) notations ==
One notation as described in Entity Relationship modeling is Chen notation or formally Chen ERD notation created originally by Peter Chen in 1976 where a one-to-many relationship is notated as 1:N where N represents the cardinality and can be 0 or higher. A many-to-one relationship is sometimes notated as N:1.

== See also ==
- One-to-one (data model)
- Many-to-many (data model)
