= SERM =

SERM may refer to:

- Selective estrogen receptor modulator
- Structured entity relationship model
- Search engine reputation management
