= ER/Studio =

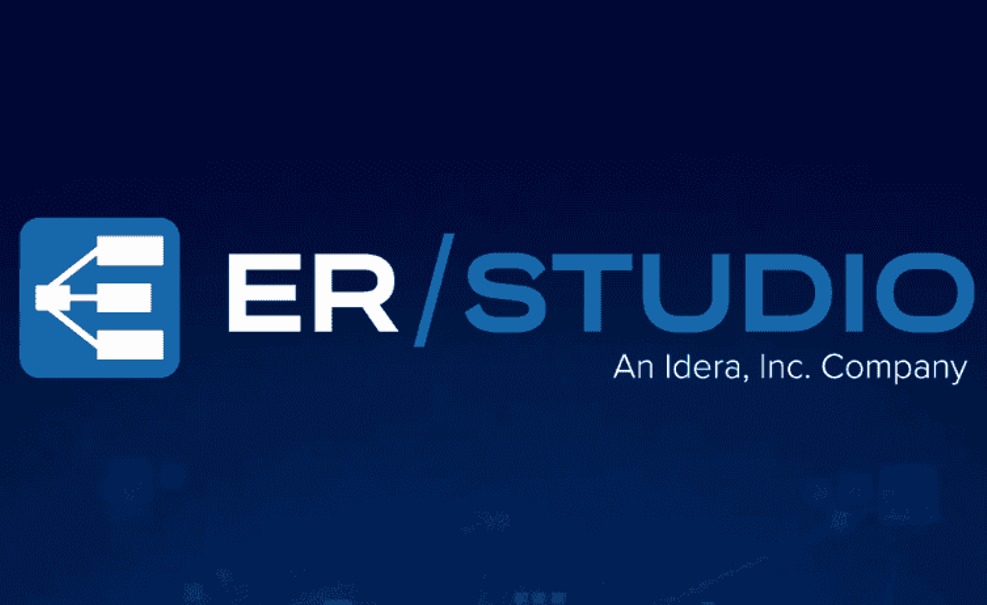
ER/Studio

ER/Studio is data architecture and data modeling software developed by IDERA, Inc. ER/Studio is compatible with multiple database platforms and is used to create and manage database designs, as well as to document and reuse data assets. In 2015, Embarcadero Technologies was acquired by database and infrastructure management software company IDERA, Inc. Since the acquisition by IDERA, Inc., ER/Studio has been renamed to ER/Studio Data Architect with updated features.

== Features ==
- Logical and physical design support
- Support for wide range of relational database platforms
- Support for NoSQL platforms such as MongoDB
- Support for JSON and JSON schema
- Automation and scripting support
- Forward- and reverse- engineering
- Automated database code generation
- Integration of models and metadata
- Collaboration support including sub model management, repository, “where used”
- Presentation formats include HTML, RTF, XML Schema, PNG, JPEG, and DTD Output
- Integrate model metadata with other platforms such as BI, ETL, and other modeling tools.
- Data lineage documentation
- Dimensional modeling
- Model completion validation
- Automatic foreign key migration
- Capacity planning
- Built-in Business Glossary
- XML Schema generation from either the logical or physical models
- Native integration with Data Governance tool Collibra
- Native integration with Data Governance tool Microsoft Purview
- ERbert AI Modeling Assistant converts natural language to data models

== Overview ==
ER/Studio has a computer-aided software engineering tool (or CASE tool). Users can utilize ER/Studio as a way to take conceptual data model and create a logical data model that is not dependent on a specific database technology. This schematic model can be used to create the physical data model. Users can then forward engineer the data definition language required to instantiate the schema for a range of database-management systems. The software includes features to graphically modify the model, including dialog boxes for specifying the number of entity–relationships, database constraints, indexes, and data uniqueness. ER/Studio supports four data modeling languages: IDEF1X, two variants of information technology engineering developed by James Martin, and a form of dimensional modeling notation.

== Version History ==
Version 16.0:

- Represent master data and transactional concepts with Business Data Objects
- Assign naming standards to models and submodels
- Provide product usage statistics on application use (optional)
- Additional platform support for Azure and Teradata

Version 16.5:

- Universal mappings and enhancements to data modeling and lineage
- Improved relationship diagramming
- Extended database platform support to include DB2 for z/OS v11 and SQL Server 2016
- Model change management enhancements
- Spell check and revisable text format for editable descriptions
- Relationship color inheritance
- Token-based repository check-out and check-in

Version 17.0:

- Updates for several MetaWizard common model bridges
- Numerous bug fixes

Version 17.1:

- Add SQL Server 2017 support for modeling and repository platform
- Extend MongoDB platform support up to version 3.6
- Support for repository on Windows Server 2016 OS
- Multiple bug fixes

Version 18.0:

Enhancements and bug fixes including:

- Selectable SQL Server driver for Forward and Reverse Engineering
- Oracle 12cR2 has been certified as a deployment platform for the DA Professional repository
- Corrected behavior to eliminate synchronization error when checking diagrams into the DA Professional repository
- Improved repository database connection verification is provided within the repository configuration screens
- Updated repository password encryption
- It is no longer necessary to uninstall and re-install the Repository when upgrading from 16.1 or later versions. The installer will now detect an existing version and upgrade in place

Version 18.1:

- Extension to 7 new MetaWizard platforms including AWS Aurora import bridge, Salesforce Database import bridge, and SAS Bridge SAS Code.
- Data Architect enhancements and bug fixes
- Multiple Team Server usability enhancements and bug fixes

Version 18.2:

- Extended Amazon Redshift cloud data support.
- 2 new MetaWizard import bridges including Amazon Web Server (AWS) Aurora Database.

Version 18.3:

- Updated PostgreSQL support
- Additional Redshift features
- Change Notifications in Team Server

Version 18.4:

- Support for Snowflake cloud database

Version 18.5:

- Ui/Ux Facelift
- Aqua Data Studio
- Oracle 18c/19c tolerance support
- Performance Improvements
- Platform Support for Oracle 18c/19c

Version 20.0

- A variety of improvements to core operations such as File Save
- Ability to add comments to view columns to improve documentation of views
- Style attributes independently of submodel to make classification of data easier
- New accessibility features
- Third-party component updates such as Log4J
- Other security improvements

Version 20.9

- Reverse-engineer hidden JSON: See the structure of semi-structured columns across platforms.
- Design hybrid models: Blend tabular and nested data in a single logical model.
- Generate JSON schemas: Output valid schema files for developers from your model.
- Visualize nested content: Use containment relationships to reflect hierarchy and structure.

== Platforms ==
ER/Studio works on the Windows operating system, Windows 10/11 (64-bit).

== Support ==
- IDEF1X
- Star schema
- Snowflake Schema
- Data warehouse
- Data mesh
- Data Lakehouse
- Data Vault
- Medallion Architecture

== See also ==
- Relational Model
- Denormalization
- Data modeling
- Data architecture
- Model-driven architecture
- RDBMS
- XML
- XML Schema
- Data warehouse
- Entity-Relationship model
