= Computer-aided lean management =

Methodology using lean management

Computer-aided lean management, in business management, is a methodology of developing and using software-controlled, lean systems integration. Its goal is to drive innovation towards cost and cycle-time savings. It attempts to create an efficient use of capital and resources through the development and use of one integrated system model to run a business's planning, engineering, design, maintenance, and operations.

== Overview ==
Computer-Aided Lean Management (CALM) is a management philosophy that uses software to reduce risk and inefficiencies. CALM acts on uncertainties and business inefficiencies to increase profitability through the use of computational decision-making tools that enable opportunities for additional value creation. It is based on the application of software to enable continuous improvement through an Integrated System Model (ISM) of the business’s physical assets, business processes, and machine learning. This integration of software applications using lean principles was developed in the aerospace industry and has migrated to the energy industry.

The creation of an ISM removes the barriers posed by the silos or stovepipes inherent in the departmentalization of most companies. Integration enables lean uses of information for the creation of actionable knowledge. CALM strives to create such a lean management approach to running the company through the rigors of software enforcement. From this software enforcement comes clear policy and procedures that are adhered to, activity-based costing, measurement of effectiveness, and the capability of using advanced algorithms for dramatic improvements in optimization of resources. CALM creates business capabilities through software to enable technology application, streamlining of processes, and a lean organizational structure. The methodology is based on a common sense approach for running a business, by measuring actions taken and using those measurements to design more efficient processes.

== History ==
CALM was inspired by lean processes and techniques that were already dominant management technologies with a wide diversity of applications and successes. Motorola and General Electric had been known for the concepts of Six Sigma; Boeing had been managing mass (using modular and flexible assembly options), and Toyota combined elements of these methodologies to create the Toyota Production System. Boeing then took the Toyota model and added computer-aided enforcement of lean methodologies throughout the manufacturing process.

One of the major sources for CALM's outgrowth was integrated definition (IDEF) modeling in aerospace manufacturing that was pioneered by the U.S. Air Force in the 1970s. IDEF is a methodology designed to model the end-to-end decisions, actions, and activities of an organization or system so that costs, performance, and cycle times can be optimized. IDEF methods have been adapted for wider use in automotive, aerospace, pharmaceuticals, and software development industries. IDEF methods serve as a starting point to understand lean management through semantic data modeling. The IDEF process begins by mapping the existing functions of an enterprise, creating a graphical model, or road map, that shows what controls each important function, who performs it, what resources are required for carrying it out, what it produces, how much it costs, and what relationships it has to other functions of the organization. IDEF simulations have been found to be efficient at streamlining and modernizing both companies and governmental agencies.

Perhaps the best-developed evolution of the IDEF model beyond Toyota was at Boeing. Their project life-cycle process has grown into a rigorous software system that links people, tasks, tools, materials, and the environmental impact of any newly planned project, before any building is allowed to begin. Routinely, more than half of the time for any given project is spent building the precedence diagrams, or three-dimensional process maps, integrating with outside suppliers, and designing the implementation plan–all on the computer. Once real activity is initiated, an action tracker is used to monitor inputs and outputs versus the schedule and delivery metrics in real time throughout the organization. When the execution of a new airplane design begins, it is so well organized that it consistently cuts both costs and build time in half for each successive generation of airframe. Boeing created a complex lean management process called 'define and control airplane configuration/manufacturing resource management' (DCAC/MRM). The process was built with the help of the operations research and computer sciences departments of the University of Pittsburgh. The manufacture of the Boeing 777 was ultimately a success, and it became the precursor to succeeding generations of CALM at Boeing.

The methodology of CALM has recently been applied to field orientated infrastructure based businesses with highly interdependent systems, such as electric utilities where a smart grid concept is being researched and developed. The management of infrastructure-based industries like oil, gas, electricity, water, transportation, and renewables requires massive investments in interdependent, physical infrastructure, as well as simultaneous attention to disparate market forces. In infrastructure businesses that manage field assets, uncertainty is the biggest impediment to profitability, rather than the maintenance of efficient supply chains or the management of factory assembly lines. These businesses are dominated by risk from uncertainties such as weather, market variations, transportation disruptions, government actions, logistic difficulties, geology, and asset reliability. CALM has been applied to deal with these types of infrastructure based challenges.
