= CATD =

CATD may refer to:

- Combined Arms and Tactics Directorate, a component of the United States Army Infantry School
- CATD, a relation of the Relational Model/Tasmania
- "Crying at the Discoteque", a 2000 single by Alcazar
- Carnitine-acylcarnitine translocase deficiency
