= Many-to-many (data model) =

Systems analysis concept

An Author can write several Books, and a Book can be written by several Authors

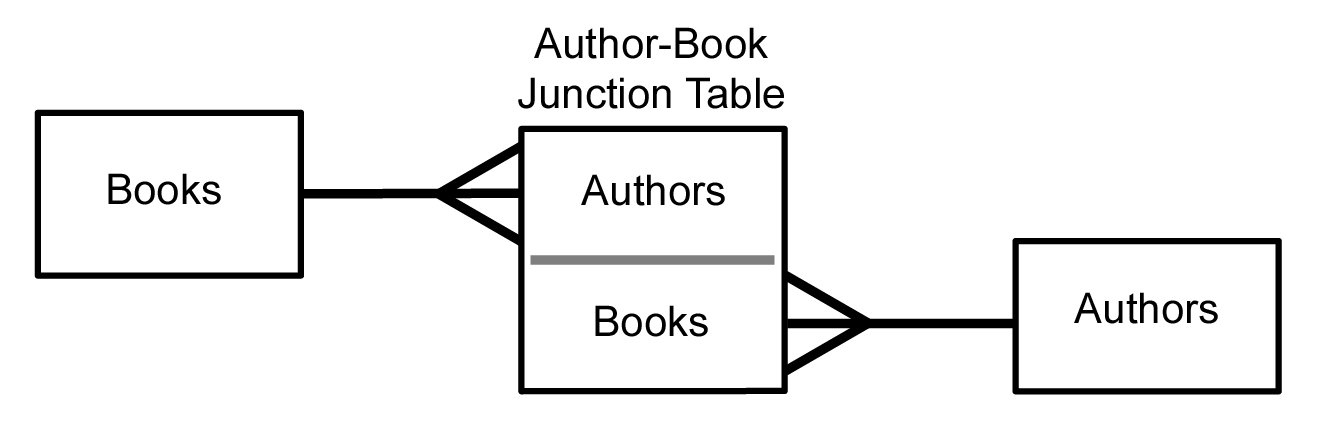
The Author-Book many-to-many relationship as a pair of one-to-many relationships with a junction table

In systems analysis, a many-to-many relationship is a type of cardinality that refers to the relationship between two entities, say, A and B, where A may contain a parent instance for which there are many children in B and vice versa.

== Data relationships ==
For example, think of A as Authors, and B as Books. An Author can write several Books, and a Book can be written by several Authors. In a relational database management system, such relationships are usually implemented by means of an associative table (also known as join table, junction table or cross-reference table), say, AB with two one-to-many relationships A → AB and B → AB. In this case the logical primary key for AB is formed from the two foreign keys (i.e. copies of the primary keys of A and B).

In web application frameworks such as CakePHP and Ruby on Rails, a many-to-many relationship between entity types represented by logical model database tables is sometimes referred to as a HasAndBelongsToMany (HABTM) relationship.

== See also ==
- Associative entity
- One-to-one (data model)
- One-to-many (data model)
