= Structured entity relationship model =

The SERM (structured entity–relationship model) is an extension of the ERM that is commonly used for data modeling. It was first proposed by Prof. Dr. Elmar J. Sinz in 1988. The SERM is commonly used in the SAP world for data modeling.

== Aims ==
1. structuring of large schemes
2. visualization of existence dependency
3. avoidance of inconsistencies
4. avoidance of unnecessary relationship types

== SERM example ==

- The entities customer and article are independent.
- Every order relates to exactly one customer. Orders without customers are illegal. Customers without any orders are legal, because they are independent entities.
- Every order relates to at least one order item.
- Every order item relates to exactly one order.
- Every invoice relates to exactly one customer. Invoices without customers are illegal. Customers without any invoice are legal.
- Every invoice relates to at least one invoice line item.
- Every invoice line item relates to exactly one order item.
- This example, like any valid SERM scheme, is already in the third normal form.
