= Control structure diagram =

A control structure diagram (CSD) automatically documents the program flow within the source code and adds indentation with graphical symbols. Thereby the source code becomes visibly structured without sacrificing space.

== See also ==
- Data structure diagram
- Diagram
- Entity–relationship model
- Unified Modeling Language
- Visual programming language
