= Data independence =

Type of data transparency

Data independence is the type of data transparency that matters for a centralized DBMS. It refers to the immunity of user applications to changes made in the definition and organization of data. Application programs should not, ideally, be exposed to details of data representation and storage. The DBMS provides an abstract view of the data that hides such details.

There are two types of data independence: physical and logical data independence.

The data independence and operation independence together give the feature of data abstraction. There are two levels of data independence.

== Logical data independence ==
The logical structure of the data is known as the 'schema definition'. In general, if a user application operates on a subset of the attributes of a relation, it should not be affected later when new attributes are added to the same relation. Logical data independence indicates that the conceptual schema can be changed without affecting the existing schemas.

== Physical data independence ==
The physical structure of the data is referred to as "physical data description". Physical data independence deals with hiding the details of the storage structure from user applications. The application should not be involved with these issues since, conceptually, there is no difference in the operations carried out against the data. There are three types of data independence:

1. Logical data independence: The ability to change the logical (conceptual) schema without changing the External schema (User View) is called logical data independence. For example, the addition or removal of new entities, attributes, or relationships to the conceptual schema or having to rewrite existing application programs.
2. Physical data independence: The ability to change the physical schema without changing the logical schema is called physical data independence. For example, a change to the internal schema, such as using different file organization or storage structures, storage devices, or indexing strategy, should be possible without having to change the conceptual or external schemas.
3. View level data independence: always independent no effect, because there doesn't exist any other level above view level.

== Data independence ==
Data independence can be explained as follows: Each higher level of the data architecture is immune to changes of the next lower level of the architecture.

The logical scheme stays unchanged even though the storage space or type of some data is changed for reasons of optimization or reorganization. In this, external schema does not change. In this, internal schema changes may be required due to some physical schema were reorganized here. Physical data independence is present in most databases and file environment in which hardware storage of encoding, exact location of data on disk, merging of records, so on this are hidden from user.

== Data independence types ==
The ability to modify schema definition in one level without affecting schema of that definition in the next higher level is called data independence. There are two levels of data independence, they are Physical data independence and Logical data independence.

1. Physical data independence is the ability to modify the physical schema without causing application programs to be rewritten. Modifications at the physical level are occasionally necessary to improve performance. It means we change the physical storage/level without affecting the conceptual or external view of the data. The new changes are absorbed by mapping techniques.
2. Logical data independence is the ability to modify the logical schema without causing application programs to be rewritten. Modifications at the logical level are necessary whenever the logical structure of the database is altered (for example, when money-market accounts are added to banking system). Logical Data independence means if we add some new columns or remove some columns from table then the user view and programs should not change. For example: consider two users A & B. Both are selecting the fields "EmployeeNumber" and "EmployeeName". If user B adds a new column (e.g. salary) to his table, it will not affect the external view for user A, though the internal schema of the database has been changed for both users A & B.

Logical data independence is more difficult to achieve than physical data independence, since application programs are heavily dependent on the logical structure of the data that they access.

== See also ==
- Network transparency
- Replication transparency
- Codd's 12 rules
- ANSI-SPARC Architecture
