= NexusDB =

- Developer: NexusQA Pty Ltd
- Stable release: 4.50.26 / February 2021
- Written in: Delphi, C++ Builder, C#
- Operating system: Windows
- Type: RDBMS
- License: Commercial
- Website: www.nexusdb.com

NexusDB is a relational commercial database engine for the Delphi, C++ Builder and .NET programming languages created by NexusDB Pty Ltd. It was developed as a successor to the TurboPower FlashFiler system for Delphi (still available for free download as of 2017). The database engine supports the SQL:2003 standard alongside Core SQL functionality as well as direct cursor-based data access.

NexusDB also provides database connectors for easy access from various development and application environments:

- ADO.NET Provider for Visual Studio; supports Windows, Android, iOS, Mac OS X targets
- ODBC/CLI Driver for Windows
- PHP Connector for Windows

The website has a Client/Server trial edition and an online manual. A free version (without source code) for embedded/single user can be downloaded via the GetIt tool in Rad Studio XE8 or newer. An SQL-based third-party database development tool, Database Workbench, has been developed by Upscene Productions. Third-party support exists for Fast Report and ReportBuilder reporting tools.
