= Merise =

Modeling methodology

Merise (French: [mə.ʁiz]) is a general-purpose modeling methodology in the field of information systems development, software engineering and project management. First introduced in the early 1980s, it was widely used in France, and was developed and refined to the point where most large French governmental, commercial and industrial organizations had adopted it as their standard methodology.

Merise proceeds to separate treatment of data and processes, where the data-oriented view is modelled in three stages, from conceptual, logical through to physical. Similarly, the process-oriented view passes through the three stages of conceptual, organizational and operational. These stages in the modelling process are paralleled by the stages of the life cycle: strategic planning, preliminary study, detailed study, development, implementation and maintenance. It is a method of analysis based on the entity-relationship model. By using Merise, you can design tables with relations to make a relational database.

== See also ==
- SSADM
- UML
- Entity-relationship model
