= Barker's notation =

Barker's notation refers to the ERD notation developed by Richard Barker, Ian Palmer, Harry Ellis et al. whilst working at the British consulting firm CACI around 1981. The notation was adopted by Barker when he joined Oracle and is effectively defined in his book Entity Relationship Modelling as part of the CASE Method series of books. This notation was and still is used by the Oracle CASE modelling tools. It is a variation of the "crows foot" style of data modelling that was favoured by many over the original Chen style of ERD modelling because of its readability and efficient use of drawing space.

The notation has features that represent the properties of relationships including cardinality and optionality (the crows foot and dashing of lines), exclusion (the exclusion arc), recursion (looping structures) and use of abstraction (nested boxes).

== See also ==
- Data modeling
