= Database Workbench =

Database software

- Original author: Upscene Productions
- Stable release: 7.1.0 / October 29, 2026; 7 days ago
- Operating system: Windows
- Type: Database design, management, development
- License: Trialware
- Website: www.upscene.com/database-workbench/

Database Workbench is a software application for development and administration of multiple relational databases using SQL, with interoperationality between different database systems, developed by Upscene Productions.

Because Databases Workbench supports multiple database systems, it can provide software developers with the same interface and development environment for these otherwise different database systems and also includes cross database tools.

== Development ==
Database Workbench started out as a developer tool specifically for InterBase, "InterBase Workbench", initially modeled after the SQL Navigator tool for Oracle Database by Quest Software. During its early years, InterBase became open-source for a short while, and soon after Firebird was created as a fork from the InterBase code base. The main developer of Database Workbench, Martijn Tonies, was closely involved in the early development of Firebird, has been a committee member of the Firebird Foundation and continues to be a Foundation member and sponsor.

Database Workbench continued to support both database systems, initially through a separate "Firebird Workbench" release. Not long after, the program became interoperational between the different database systems and this initial support for multiple database systems led to the renaming of the product to its current title "Database Workbench" in 2003. It also opened the path to the inclusion of support for more database systems: support for Microsoft SQL Server and MySQL was added in 2003; in 2005, support for Oracle Database and NexusDB was added and SQL Anywhere support followed in 2008. Early 2010, a full Unicode version of Database Workbench was released and version 5 of Database Workbench was released in August 2014.

In December 2021, Database Workbench 6 was released with a revamped user interface including a more consistent look and feel and the multi-threaded loading of database metadata. This version introduced the Enterprise Edition with its TeamServer component. In 2024, SQLite support was added.

Database Workbench 7 was released in July 2026, adding AI features, dark mode, additional data import and export features and many use interface improvements.

A free version for personal use with limited functionality, Database Workbench Lite, is available for MySQL and Firebird.

== Supported databases and environments ==
The current available version of Database Workbench supports the following relational databases: Oracle Database, Microsoft SQL Server, Firebird, NexusDB, InterBase, MySQL, MariaDB, SQLite and PostgreSQL Version 6 of Database Workbench is a 64-bit application for Windows platforms, previous versions were 32-bit. Under Linux, FreeBSD or Mac OS X Database Workbench can operate using Wine.

== Features ==
Database Workbench can be used to view, create and edit tables, indexes, stored procedures and other database meta data objects. It also supports:

- visual database design/diagramming, both conceptual and physical, including reverse engineering
- testing SQL queries and viewing query plans
- AI assisted SQL and table development
- AI assisted query performance analysis
- step-by-step debugging of stored routines
- generating test data
- import and export of data
- transferring data directly between database systems (via DataPump tool)
- data compare and synchronization
- database schema compare and change script creation
- database schema migration, also from one database system to another
- database schema search to search object names and source code
- visual privilege management
- dependency browsing
- manage security items like users, groups and roles
- report designer to create printable reports based on database queries
- print database schema, source code, lists of objects or query result sets
- BLOB (binary large object) editor with support for images, HTML, PDF and RTF, DOC and DOCX documents
- open MS Access databases (Basic Edition)
- open ODBC or ADO data sources (Pro Edition)
- built-in Version Control System available (Enterprise Edition)

It includes several productivity features:

- Favorite Databases for easy access to your most used databases
- AI assisted SQL development
- SQL Insight including "Join Completion"
- Parameter Insight
- Code Templates
- Object Templates
- Name Templates
- Two-way Visual Query Builder

== History ==
- Initially created as InterBase Workbench
- Version 1: 2001
- Version 1.4: 2002, Firebird Workbench to only work with Firebird. InterBase Workbench works with both Firebird and InterBase.
- Version 2: 2003, renamed to Database Workbench with modular approach for supported database systems, Microsoft SQL Server, MySQL, Oracle and NexusDB support added.
- Version 3: 2007, SQL Anywhere support added.
- Version 4: 2010, fully Unicode enabled.
- Version 5: 2014, High DPI aware and support for PostgreSQL added.
- Version 6: 2021, Enterprise Edition added, a special multi-user version with central repository of servers, databases and workspaces and a database Version Control System. SQL Anywhere support removed.
- Version 6.4: 2024, SQLite support added.
- Version 7.0: 2026, AI features, dark mode, many user interface improvements.
