= Relational Model/Tasmania =

Relational Model/Tasmania (RM/T) was published by Edgar F. Codd in 1979 and is the name given to a number of extensions to his original relational model (RM) published in 1970. The overall goal of the RM/T was to define some fundamental semantic units, at "atomic" and "molecular" levels, for data modelling. Codd writes: "the result is a model with a richer variety of objects than the original relational model, additional insert-update-delete rules and some additional operators that make the algebra more powerful."

== RM history ==
Between 1968 and 1988 Codd published over 30 papers on the relational model (RM) - the most famous of which is his 1970 paper. Up to 1978 the papers describe RM Version 1 (RM/V1). In early 1979 Codd first presented some new ideas, called RM/T ('T' for Tasmania), at an invited talk for the Australian Computer Science Conference in Hobart, Tasmania. Later that year the ACM journal published a paper on RM/T, in which Codd acknowledges the influence of Schmid & Swensen (1975) and Wiederhold (1977).

A later version of RM/T (we shall call it here "RM/D") was described by Chris Date in Date (1983) in which Date and Codd improved and refined RM/T, adding an entity type called designative. Although Codd writes nothing about this new type, Date offers a rationale in Date (1983, page 262). Date revised this 1983 article in Date (1995), which additionally compares the RM/T model with the E/R model.

Following a disappointing uptake of RM/T by the database industry, Codd decided to introduce the RM/T model more gradually. He planned to release a sequence of RM versions: RM/V2, RM/V3 etc. each time progressively including some of the ideas of the original RM/T into the new version. Perhaps this explains why there is no obvious mapping of concepts between RM/T and RM/V2. For example, there is no reference to associative or designative entity types in Codd's 1990 book that defines RM/V2. On the other hand, the book extends and builds on the existing body of query language issues, many of which were addressed by Codd in several papers throughout the 1980s.

== Summary of RM/T ==
Introducing some of the new concepts of RM/T:

Surrogates
A surrogate is a unique value assigned to each entity. If two relations use the same surrogate value then they represent the same entity in the modelled universe. The surrogate value can be any unique string or number but cannot be assigned or changed by the database user. For example, a SQL SEQUENCE is often used to generate numerical surrogate values. This use of surrogate was first introduced in Hall, Owlett and Todd in 1976.

Entities and Nonentities
An entity is some thing in the modelled universe and is typically identified by a surrogate. A nonentity is some thing that is not an entity and does not have its own identifying surrogate. An independent entity has its own surrogate. A dependent entity has a surrogate but it belongs to another entity, i.e. the surrogate is a foreign key.

Atomic Semantics
The RM/T addresses atomic semantics by describing how the original RM relation can be used to describe entities with attributes. An entity is represented as an Entity-relation or E-relation and its attributes (or immediate properties) are stored in separate Property-relations or P-relations. Each E-relation shares its surrogate with the associated P-relations.

E-relations
Mark the existence of an entity. An E-relation is a relation (table) storing only the surrogates for a particular entity type. A surrogate value entered into the E-relation table implies the corresponding existence of an entity of that type in the modelled world. For example, the E-relation "Employee" is a table containing the surrogates of all entities of type Employee.

P-relations
Store the attribute values of an entity. A P-relation is a relation (table) storing the surrogate and one or more attributes of an entity. The surrogate value of a P-relation is that of the corresponding E-relation; it plays the role (K-role) of the primary key for that P-relation. For example, the P-relation "Employee_Number" is a table with two columns: one containing the surrogate value of the "Employee" E-relation, the other containing the employee number.

Note that by performing an OUTER NATURAL JOIN on the RM/T "Employee" E-relation and "Employee_Person" P-relation we can construct the RM/V1 "Employee" relation. This illustrates why the E-relation and P-relation concepts of RM/T are more atomic than the relation concept of RM/V1.

Molecular Semantics
The RM/T addresses molecular semantics by taking the original RM and categorising the relations into several entity types, increasing the information captured by the semantic data model. However Codd does not define a notation for diagramming his new semantics. Each entity may play several roles at once and thus belong to one or more of the following entity types:
- Characteristic – subordinate entities that describe kernel entities.
- Associative – superordinate entities that interrelate kernel entities.
- Kernel – entities that are neither characteristic or associative.

Codd goes on to introduce subtyping of entities, giving yet another qualifier for entities:
- Inner – entities that are not subtypes of another entity.

Hence Codd speaks of inner kernel and inner associative entities.

The following definition is based on the RM/D model in Date (1983); it does not appear in Codd (1979):
- Designative – entities that contain a designation. A designative entity is at the many end of a one-to-many relationship between two independent entities. For example, a writer may write many books, hence a one-to-many relationship between writer and book entities; the book is the designative entity because it contains a designation (or designative reference) to the writer - namely the primary key of the writer entity. Note that an associative entity contains at least two designations. For example, we can regard a booking as either an entity that associates a person with a flight, or as an entity that designates a person and designates a flight. Hence a designative entity must contain at least one designation whereas an associative entity must contain at least two designations.

Associations
These are what we might otherwise call relationships between entities or non-entities.
The value E-null is used when deleteting entities from the RM/T model; all associations that have surrogates referring to a non-existing entity are assigned the value E-null, meaning the entity is unknown.

Associative Entity and Nonentity Association
An associative entity is an entity that represents an association between two independent entities; the associative entity is an entity in itself because it has a surrogate. A nonentity association is similar to an associative entity however it has no surrogate. This lack of a surrogate stops the nonentity association from having, for example, any descriptive characteristic entities.

Directed Graph Relations
Several directed graph relations are defined to capture further semantic features of the RM/T model. These graphs are named as follows:
- PG-relation (Property Graph) stores property relationships
- CG-relation (Characteristic Graph) stores characteristic relationships
- AG-relation (Association Graph) stores association relationships
- UGI-relation (Unconditional Generalisation by Inclusion) stores generalisation by inclusion relationships
- AGI-relation (Alternative Generalisation by Inclusion) stores generalisation by alternative relationships
- US-relation (Unconditional Successor) stores unconditional successor relationships
- AS-relation (Alternative Successor) stores alternative successor relationships
- KG-relation (Cover Membership) stores cover membership relationships
- UP-relation (Unconditional Precedence) stores unconditional succession of event relationships
- AP-relation (Alternative Precedence) stores alternative succession of event relationships

RM/T Catalog
The Catalog is a meta-model storing the descriptions of the relations themselves. The RM/T Catalog comprises the following relations:
- CATR (R-surrogate, relname, RelType) describes relations
- CATRA (RA-surrogate, R-surrogate, A-surrogate) relates relations and attributes
- CATA (A-surrogate, attname, UserKey) describes attributes
- CATAD (AD-surrogate, A-surrogate, D-surrogate) relates attributes and domains
- CATD (D-surrogate, domname, VType, Ordering) describes domains
- CATC (C-surrogate, pername) describes categories
- CATRC (RC-surrogate, R-surrogate, C-surrogate) relates relations and categories

where
- relname is the textual name of a relation. e.g. "Address"
- attname is the textual name of an attribute. e.g. "Street"
- domname is the textual name of a domain. e.g. "Salary"
- pername is the category label (from the PER-domain)
- RN-domain is the domain of all relnames in the database
- PER-domain is the domain of all category labels
- E-domain is the domain of all surrogates in the database
- E-attribute is any attribute that plays the role of a surrogate (from the E-domain)
- E-null is the "entity unknown" surrogate (from the E-domain)
- R-surrogate is the relation surrogate (from the E-domain)
- A-surrogate is the attribute surrogate (from the E-domain)
- D-surrogate is the domain surrogate (from the E-domain)
- C-surrogate is the category label surrogate (from the E-domain)
- RA-surrogate is the relation-attribute surrogate (from the E-domain)
- AD-surrogate is the attribute-domain surrogate (from the E-domain)
- RC-surrogate is the relation-category-label surrogate (from the E-domain)
- RelType is the type of object represented by the relation
- UserKey shows whether the attribute participates in a user-defined key
- VType is the syntactic type of the value
- Ordering shows whether the operator > is applicable between values of the domain

Operators
Numerous operators are defined on names, sets and graphs. See Codd's 1979 paper for details.

== RM/T today ==
There is little mention of RM/T today and no articles have appeared recently. Peckam and Maryanski (1988) wrote about RM/T in their study of semantic data models. Codd published his book in 1990 but wrote nothing more about RM/T. RM/V1 and RM/V2 have a chapter each in Date and Darwen (1992) and the Date (1983) article was updated in (1995) and now contains a long overdue comparison of the E/R model and RM/T. Date's most recent reflections can be found on the Web at Date (1999), The Database Relational Model (2001) and Date on RM/T (2003).

RM/T contributed to the body of knowledge called semantic data modeling and semantic object modeling and continues to influence new data modellers. See the paper by Hammer and McLeod (1981), the book by Knoenke (2001) and implementation by Grabczewski et alia (2004).
