= Three-schema approach =

Approach to building information systems

The notion of a three-schema model was first introduced in 1975 by the ANSI/X3/SPARC three level architecture, which determined three levels to model data.

The three-schema approach, or three-schema concept, in software engineering is an approach to building information systems and systems information management that originated in the 1970s. It proposes three different views in systems development, with conceptual modelling being considered the key to achieving data integration.

== Overview ==
The three-schema approach provides for three types of schemas with schema techniques based on formal language descriptions:

- External schema for user views
- Conceptual schema integrates external schemata
- Internal schema that defines physical storage structures

At the center, the conceptual schema defines the ontology of the concepts as the users think of them and talk about them. The physical schema according to Sowa (2004) "describes the internal formats of the data stored in the database, and the external schema defines the view of the data presented to the application programs." The framework attempted to permit multiple data models to be used for external schemata.

Over the years, the skill and interest in building information systems has grown tremendously. However, for the most part, the traditional approach to building systems has only focused on defining data from two distinct views, the "user view" and the "computer view". From the user view, which will be referred to as the “external schema,” the definition of data is in the context of reports and screens designed to aid individuals in doing their specific jobs. The required structure of data from a usage view changes with the business environment and the individual preferences of the user. From the computer view, which will be referred to as the "internal schema", data is defined in terms of file structures for storage and retrieval. The required structure of data for computer storage depends upon the specific computer technology employed and the need for efficient processing of data.

| Figure 1: Traditional View of Data | Figure 2: Three schema approach |

These two traditional views of data have been defined by analysts over the years on an application by application basis as specific business needs were addressed, see Figure 1. Typically, the internal schema defined for an initial application cannot be readily used for subsequent applications, resulting in the creation of redundant and often inconsistent definition of the same data. Data was defined by the layout of physical records and processed sequentially in early information systems. The need for flexibility, however, led to the introduction of Database Management Systems (DBMSs), which allow for random access of logically connected pieces of data. The logical data structures within a DBMS are typically defined as either hierarchies, networks or relations. Although DBMSs have greatly improved the shareability of data, the use of a DBMS alone does not guarantee a consistent definition of data. Furthermore, most large companies have had to develop multiple databases which are often under the control of different DBMSs and still have the problems of redundancy and inconsistency.

The recognition of this problem led the ANSI/X3/SPARC Study Group on Database Management Systems to conclude that in an ideal data management environment a third view of data is needed. This view, referred to as a "conceptual schema" is a single integrated definition of the data within an enterprise which is unbiased toward any single application of data and is independent of how the data is physically stored or accessed, see Figure 2. The primary objective of this conceptual schema is to provide a consistent definition of the meanings and interrelationship of data which can be used to integrate, share, and manage the integrity of data.

== History ==
Image of the six layers in the Zachman Framework.

The notion of a three-schema model consisting of a conceptual model, an external model, and an internal or physical model was first introduced by the ANSI/X3/SPARC Standards Planning and Requirements Committee directed by Charles Bachman in 1975. The ANSI/X3/SPARC Report characterized DBMSs as having a two-schema organization. That is, DBMSs utilize an internal schema, which represents the structure of the data as viewed by the DBMS, and an external schema, which represents various structures of the data as viewed by the end user. The concept of a third schema (conceptual) was introduced in the report. The conceptual schema represents the basic underlying structure of data as viewed by the enterprise as a whole.

The ANSI/SPARC report was intended as a basis for interoperable computer systems. All database vendors adopted the three-schema terminology, but they implemented it in incompatible ways. Over the next twenty years, various groups attempted to define standards for the conceptual schema and its mappings to databases and programming languages. Unfortunately, none of the vendors had a strong incentive to make their formats compatible with their competitors'. A few reports were produced, but no standards.

As the practice of data administration and graphical techniques have evolved, the term "schema" has given way to the term "model". The conceptual model represents the view of data that is negotiated between end users and database administrators covering those entities about which it is important to keep data, the meaning of the data, and the relationships of the data to each other.

One further development is the IDEF1X information modeling methodology, which is based on the three-schema concept. Another is the Zachman Framework, proposed by John Zachman in 1987 and developed ever since in the field of Enterprise Architecture. In this framework, the three-schema model has evolved into a layer of six perspectives. In other Enterprise Architecture frameworks some kind of view model is incorporated.

== See also ==
- ANSI-SPARC Architecture
- Conceptual schema
- Data model
- Data modeling
- Entity–relationship model
- Information systems
- Object–role modeling
- View model
- UNIFACE programming language
