= Decision time =

Time when a decision was made in a temporal database

In temporal databases, decision time is the time when a decision was made about a fact stored in a database. It is used to keep a history of decisions about valid times.

In a database table, the start and end time of the decision time interval can be represented by adding two table columns. This interval is closed [ in the lower bound, and open at the upper bound ). When a decision has not been replaced, the end time of the decision is unknown, and it can thus be considered valid "until changed" or infinite (∞).

Valid time and decision time are ways of modeling data, and is not applicable for all types of data, and transaction time is hence the most used temporal functionality. The concept of decision time can for example be used in bitemporal databases (together with valid time instead of transaction time), or in tritemporal databases.

== History ==
The term decision time was coined by Mario Nascimento and Margaret Eich (1995).

Although the ISO SQL standard has included support for "application-time period tables" (valid time tables) and "system-versioned tables" (transaction tables) since SQL:2011, it does however not include specific clauses for decision time.

== Comparison with valid time and transaction time ==
In a tritemporal database, valid times are a history of valid time periods for facts stored in the database. The decision times are a history of decisions about validity times, and transaction times are again a history of decision times. Thus, transaction times are a history of meta-histories ("histories of histories").

Decision time is unconstrained in relationship to valid time, but it must be earlier than the transaction time. For example, the decision time can not be assigned a date in the future.

== Example ==
The following is a list of real events that occurred between the 1964 and 1976 United States presidential elections:

Date	Decision maker	Real world event
1964-11-03	Electoral College	Election of 1964
1968-11-05	Electoral College	Election of 1968
1972-11-07	Electoral College	Election of 1972
1973-10-10	Spiro Agnew	Agnew resigns
1973-10-12	Richard Nixon	Nixon nominates Ford
1973-12-06	Congress	Congress confirms Ford
1974-08-09	Richard Nixon	Nixon resigns
1974-08-20	Gerald Ford	Ford nominates Rockefeller
1974-12-19	Congress	Congress confirms Rockefeller
1976-11-02	Electoral College	Election of 1976

In this example, a constant 7-day delay is assumed between the decision time and the transaction time when the data is committed to the database. Given those conditions, the database would have contained the following information after the election in 1976:

		Valid		Decision		Transaction	
President	Vice	From	To	From	To	From	To
Johnson	Humphrey	1965-01-20	1969-01-20	1964-11-03	∞	1964-11-10	∞
Nixon	Agnew	1969-01-20	1973-01-20	1968-11-05	∞	1968-11-12	∞
Nixon	Agnew	1973-01-20	1977-01-20	1972-11-07	∞	1972-11-14	1973-10-17
Nixon	Agnew	1973-01-20	1977-01-20	1972-11-07	1973-10-10	1973-10-17	∞
Nixon	Agnew	1973-01-20	1973-10-10	1973-10-10	∞	1973-10-17	∞
Nixon	(Vacant)	1973-10-10	1977-01-20	1973-10-10	∞	1973-10-17	1973-12-13
Nixon	Ford	∞	1977-01-20	1973-10-12	∞	1973-10-19	1973-12-13
Nixon	(Vacant)	1973-10-10	1977-01-20	1973-10-10	1973-12-06	1973-12-13	∞
Nixon	(Vacant)	1973-10-10	1973-12-06	1973-12-06	∞	1973-12-13	∞
Nixon	Ford	∞	1977-01-20	1973-10-12	1973-12-06	1973-12-13	∞
Nixon	Ford	1973-12-06	1977-01-20	1973-12-06	∞	1973-12-13	1974-08-15
Nixon	Ford	1973-12-06	1977-01-20	1973-12-06	1974-08-08	1974-08-15	∞
Nixon	Ford	1973-12-06	1974-08-09	1974-10-08	∞	1974-08-15	∞
Ford	(Vacant)	1974-08-09	1977-01-20	1974-10-08	∞	1974-08-15	1974-12-26
Ford	Rockefeller	∞	1977-01-20	1974-10-20	∞	1974-08-27	1974-12-26
Ford	(Vacant)	1974-08-09	1977-01-20	1974-10-08	1974-12-19	1974-12-26	∞
Ford	(Vacant)	1974-08-09	1974-12-19	1974-12-19	∞	1974-12-26	∞
Ford	Rockefeller	∞	1977-01-20	1974-08-20	1974-12-19	1974-12-26	∞
Ford	Rockefeller	1974-12-19	1977-01-20	1974-12-19	∞	1974-12-26	∞
Carter	Mondale	1977-01-20	1981-01-20	1976-11-02	∞	1976-11-09	∞

Given the 7-day delayed table above, the question "who was president and vice president for the valid time of 1977-01-01" (which given the 7-day delay could provide data for 1976-12-25) would be:

- Nixon/Agnew when using a decision time and transaction time of 1972-11-14
- Nixon/(Vacant) when using a decision time and transaction time of 1973-10-17
- Nixon/Ford when using a decision time and transaction time of 1974-08-08
- Ford/(Vacant) when using a decision time of 1974-08-08 and transaction time of current
- Ford/Rockefeller when using a decision time and transaction time of current

== See also ==
- Valid time, when an event in a database happened in the real world
- Transaction time, when data was loaded into a database
