= Richard T. Snodgrass =

American computer scientist and writer (born 1955)

- Born: April 19, 1955 (age 71); Amarillo, Texas, United States
- Education: Carnegie Mellon University (Ph.D 1982); Carnegie Mellon University (MS 1978); Carleton College (BA 1977)
- Known for: temporal databases query language design query optimization and evaluation
- Awards: Outstanding Contribution to ACM Award (2004); ACM SIGMOD Contributions Award (2002)
- Scientific career
- Fields: Computer Scientist
- Workplaces: University of North Carolina; University of Arizona
- Doctoral advisor: William Allan Wulf

Richard Thomas Snodgrass (born April 19, 1955) is an American computer scientist and writer and is professor emeritus at the University of Arizona. He is best known for his work on temporal databases, query language design, query optimization and evaluation, storage structures, database design, and ergalics (the science of computing).

== Biography ==
Snodgrass was born on April 19, 1955. He attended Carleton College for a Bachelor of Arts (Physics) and then Carnegie Mellon University for an M.S. as well as a PhD in Computer Science, which he earned in 1982 under the guidance of William Allan Wulf. He has been an ACM Fellow since 1999. He has been a member of the Advisory Board of ACM SIGMOD, of the ACM History Committee, and of the editorial board of ACM Ubiquity.

He is married to Merrie Brucks, the Robert and Kathleen Eckert Professor of Marketing Emeritus at the Eller College of Management.

== Work ==
Snodgrass and his doctoral student Ilsoo Ahn originated the concept of valid time and transaction time. As of December 2011, ISO/IEC 9075, Database Language SQL:2011 Part 2: SQL/Foundation included clauses in table definitions to define "application-time period tables" (valid-time tables) and "system-versioned tables" (transaction-time tables).

TSQL2, a temporal extension to the SQL-92 language standard, was designed by the TSQL2 committee, which was formed in July, 1993. Snodgrass chaired the TSQL2 language design committee. The committee produced a preliminary language specification the following January, which appeared in the March 1994 ACM SIGMOD Record.

Various members of the temporal database research community have worked to transfer some of the constructs and insights of TSQL2 into SQL3, termed SQL/Temporal. Snodgrass initiated SQL/Temporal part of the SQL3 draft standard. SQL/Temporal has been partially implemented in Oracle, Teradata version 14, and IBM DB2 10.

Snodgrass along with Christian Jensen co-chairs TimeCenter, an international center for the support of temporal database applications on traditional and emerging DBMS technologies. The center has published more than 90 articles since 1997, many of which have been accepted in leading computer science journals.

== Association for Computing Machinery ==
Snodgrass worked as a volunteer for Association for Computing Machinery (ACM) from the mid-1990s. He has chaired the ACM Publications Board and the ACM History Committee and has served on ACM Council. He has chaired the ACM SIGMOD Special Interest Group on Management of Data from 1997 to 2001. In 2001–07, he was Editor-in-Chief of the ACM Transactions on Database Systems.

Snodgrass presented to the ACM Council a proposal for "a new ACM service, the ACM Computing Portal," a web-based repository of bibliographic information of all the computing literature. The proposal arrived at a ballpark figure of one million items that captured the entire history of computing, from roughly 1940 to 2000. The ACM Portal, also called the ACM Guide, was released to the public on May 21, 2003. This resource was later expanded into the ACM Digital Library, which has opened for public access more than 100,000 scientific articles from 1951 through 2000.

As the chair of the ACM Publications Board, Snodgrass developed a strategic vision for the Association for Computing Machinery to become the preferred publisher for computer science and proposed a far-ranging policy that recognizes the rights and responsibilities of readers, authors, reviewers, editors and libraries.

== Publications ==
Snodgrass is the author or editor of several books including:

- Developing Time-Oriented Database Applications in SQL, Richard T. Snodgrass, Morgan Kaufmann Publishers, Inc., San Francisco, July, 1999, 504+xxiii pages, ISBN 1-55860-436-7.
- The TSQL2 Temporal Query Language, The TSQL2 Language Design Committee consisted of Richard T. Snodgrass (chair), Ilsoo Ahn, Gad Ariav, Don Batory, James Clifford, Curtis E. Dyreson, Ramez Elmasri, Fabio Grandi, Christian S. Jensen, Wolfgang Käfer, Nick Kline, Krishna Kulkarni, T. Y. Cliff Leung, Nikos Lorentzos, John F. Roddick, Arie Segev, Michael D. Soo and Suryanarayana M. Sripada, Kluwer Academic Publishers, 1995, 674+xxiv pages, ISBN 0-8053-2413-5, QA76.9.D3T4125.
- Temporal Databases: Theory, Design, and Implementation, Abdullah Tansel, James Clifford, Shashi Gadia, Sushil Jajodia, Arie Segev, and Richard T. Snodgrass (editors), Database Systems and Applications Series, Benjamin/Cummings Pub. Co., Redwood City, CA, March 1993, 633+xx pages, ISBN 0-8053-2413-5, QA76.9.D3T4125.
- The Interface Description Language: Definition and Use, Richard T. Snodgrass with contributions from Karen P. Shannon, Jerry S. Kickenson, Mike A. Shapiro, Dean D. Throop, William B. Warren, David A. Lamb, John R. Nestor, and William A. Wulf, Principles of Computer Science Series, Computer Science Press, Rockville, MD, 1989, 615+xv pages.

Snodgrass has written more than 90 refereed articles in the following areas:

- General Topics in Temporal Databases
- Conceptual Design of Temporal Databases
- Logical Design of Temporal Databases
- Physical Design of Temporal Databases
- Design of Query Languages for Temporal Databases
- Algebras for Temporal Databases
- Implementation of Temporal Databases
- Temporal XML
- Auditing, Compliance, and Forensic Analysis
- Monitoring Distributed Systems
- Software Development Environments
