= Hash key =

Hash key may refer to:

- Telephone keypad § Hash key, also known as the number, pound or hash key, a key on a telephone keypad
- For its use in data structure, database and cryptographic applications, see hash function or unique key
