= Persistent object identifier =

In database design, a persistent object identifier (POID) is a unique identifier of a record on a table, used as the primary key. Important characteristics of a POID are that it does not carry business information and are not generally exported or otherwise made visible to data users; as such a POID has many of the characteristics of a surrogate key. The only purpose of the POID is to act as the primary key on the table where it is defined and to be referenced as the foreign key by other tables. Because POIDs, like surrogate keys, do not carry business information, they are immune to changes in the form or meaning of business data. It can therefore make it easier to maintain relations between objects and make queries simpler.

== See also ==
- Natural key
- Primary key
- Surrogate key
- Unique key
- Object identifier
