= Energy Points =

Source energy measurement company

- Industry: Enterprise Energy Management
- Headquarters: Boston, MA, U.S.
- Key people: Dr. Ory Zik (Founder & CEO); Roy Stein (Co-founder & COO); Bill Rebozo (VP Product)
- Website: N/A

Energy Points was a privately held source energy intelligence company. Its SaaS platform measured energy use from its source through the site of consumption. By measuring what is known as "source energy," the company is able to convert all energy sources, including water, electricity, fuels, and materials, into a single common unit. It was acquired by Lux Research in 2015.

== History ==
Energy Points was founded in May 2011 by Dr. Ory Zik and Roy Stein and is based in Boston, Massachusetts.

In December 2011, the company secured $3 million in Series A financing from U.S.-based Plan-B Ventures before formally launching in February 2012.

In April 2014, it was honored as one of the top five of the top 10 in The Wall Street Journal's rankings of The Next Big Thing in Clean Tech and invited to pitch at the ECO:nomics conference.

Energy Points was acquired by research and advisory firm Lux Research in February 2015 Lux Research is a spin-off of Lux Capital.

== Product ==
The company's product, Energy Points Analytics, takes enterprise's on-site energy consumption data and maps it to its database of geospatial source energy data. Mathematical models process this data and generate source-to-site energy analytics, which can be viewed in the Energy Points portal or integrated with 3rd-party dashboards and services.

== Science and technology ==
The Energy Points platform uses proprietary algorithms, coupled with geospatial and temporal databases to convert all domains (water, electricity, transportation, etc.) into the amount of primary energy (crude oil) embodied in one gallon of gasoline in order to help companies calculate and communicate their resource consumption in a comprehensive way.

Energy Points’ methodology is based on three principles:

1. Resources such as electricity, water, fuels, and materials can be measured as energy;
2. The energy we use must be measured from its source; and
3. Source-to-site energy analysis should incorporate environmental externalities.
