= Private Enterprise Number =

Private Enterprise Numbers (PENs) are created and maintained by the Internet Assigned Numbers Authority (IANA) in a public registry. The registry includes the name of the assignee, a publicly-displayed email address, and a "contact name." Any organization or individual may request, at no cost, a Private Enterprise Number (PEN) assignment. Requirements are documented in the request form and in RFC 9371. All registration requests are reviewed manually.

Enterprise numbers are commonly used in the Management Information Base (MIB) associated with the Simple Network Management Protocol (SNMP), in vendor suboptions of the Dynamic Host Configuration Protocol (DHCP), in Lightweight Directory Access Protocol (LDAP), RADIUS Vendor-specific attributes, PFCP Vendor Specific IEs and in syslog structured data (RFC 5424).

== See also ==
- Object identifier
