= Change data capture =

Set of software design patterns in a database

In databases, change data capture (CDC) is a set of software design patterns used to determine and track the data that has changed (the "deltas") so that action can be taken using the changed data. The result is a delta-driven dataset.

CDC is an approach to data integration that is based on the identification, capture and delivery of the changes made to enterprise data sources. For instance it can be used for incremental update of data loading.

CDC occurs often in data warehouse environments since capturing and preserving the state of data across time is one of the core functions of a data warehouse, but CDC can be utilized in any database or data repository system.

== Methodology ==
System developers can set up CDC mechanisms in a number of ways and in any one or a combination of system layers from application logic down to physical storage.

In a simplified CDC context, one computer system has data believed to have changed from a previous point in time, and a second computer system needs to take action based on that changed data. The former is the source, the latter is the target. It is possible that the source and target are the same system physically, but that would not change the design pattern logically. Multiple CDC solutions can exist in a single system.

=== Timestamps on rows ===
Tables whose changes must be captured may have a column that represents the time of last change. Names such as LAST_UPDATE, LAST_MODIFIED, etc. are common. Any row in any table that has a timestamp in that column that is more recent than the last time data was captured is considered to have changed.

Timestamps on rows are also frequently used for optimistic locking so this column is often available.

=== Version numbers on rows ===
Database designers give tables whose changes must be captured a column that contains a version number. Names such as VERSION_NUMBER, etc. are common.

One technique is to mark each changed row with a version number. A current version is maintained for the table, or possibly a group of tables. This is stored in a supporting construct such as a reference table. When a change capture occurs, all data with the latest version number is considered to have changed. Once the change capture is complete, the reference table is updated with a new version number.

(Do not confuse this technique with row-level versioning used for optimistic locking. For optimistic locking each row has an independent version number, typically a sequential counter. This allows a process to atomically update a row and increment its counter only if another process has not incremented the counter. But CDC cannot use row-level versions to find all changes unless it knows the original "starting" version of every row. This is impractical to maintain.)

=== Status indicators on rows ===
This technique can either supplement or complement timestamps and versioning. It can configure an alternative if, for example, a status column is set up on a table row indicating that the row has changed (e.g., a boolean column that, when set to true, indicates that the row has changed). Otherwise, it can act as a complement to the previous methods, indicating that a row, despite having a new version number or a later date, still shouldn't be updated on the target (for example, the data may require human validation).

=== Time/version/status on rows ===
This approach combines the three previously discussed methods. As noted, it is not uncommon to see multiple CDC solutions at work in a single system, however, the combination of time, version, and status provides a particularly powerful mechanism and programmers should utilize them as a trio where possible. The three elements are not redundant or superfluous. Using them together allows for such logic as, "Capture all data for version 2.1 that changed between 2005-06-01 00:00 and 2005-07-01 00:00 where the status code indicates it is ready for production."

=== Triggers on tables ===
May include a publish/subscribe pattern to communicate the changed data to multiple targets. In this approach, triggers log events that happen to the transactional table into another queue table that can later be "played back". For example, imagine an Accounts table, when transactions are taken against this table, triggers would fire that would then store a history of the event or even the deltas into a separate queue table. The queue table might have schema with the following fields: Id, TableName, RowId, Timestamp, Operation. The data inserted for our Account sample might be: 1, Accounts, 76, 2008-11-02 00:15, Update. More complicated designs might log the actual data that changed. This queue table could then be "played back" to replicate the data from the source system to a target.

Data capture offers a challenge in that the structure, contents and use of a transaction log is specific to a database management system. Unlike data access, no standard exists for transaction logs. Most database management systems do not document the internal format of their transaction logs, although some provide programmatic interfaces to their transaction logs (for example: Oracle, DB2, SQL/MP, SQL/MX and SQL Server 2008).

Other challenges in using transaction logs for change data capture include:

- Coordinating the reading of the transaction logs and the archiving of log files (database management software typically archives log files off-line on a regular basis).
- Translation between physical storage formats that are recorded in the transaction logs and the logical formats typically expected by database users (e.g., some transaction logs save only minimal buffer differences that are not directly useful for change consumers).
- Dealing with changes to the format of the transaction logs between versions of the database management system.
- Eliminating uncommitted changes that the database wrote to the transaction log and later rolled back.
- Dealing with changes to the metadata of tables in the database.

CDC solutions based on transaction log files have distinct advantages that include:

- minimal impact on the database (even more so if one uses log shipping to process the logs on a dedicated host).
- no need for programmatic changes to the applications that use the database.
- low latency in acquiring changes.
- transactional integrity: log scanning can produce a change stream that replays the original transactions in the order they were committed. Such a change stream include changes made to all tables participating in the captured transaction.
- no need to change the database schema

== Confounding factors ==
As often occurs in complex domains, the final solution to a CDC problem may have to balance many competing concerns.

=== Unsuitable source systems ===
Change data capture both increases in complexity and reduces in value if the source system saves metadata changes when the data itself is not modified. For example, some Data models track the user who last looked at but did not change the data in the same structure as the data. This results in noise in the Change Data Capture.

=== Tracking the capture ===
Actually tracking the changes depends on the data source. If the data is being persisted in a modern database then Change Data Capture is a simple matter of permissions. Two techniques are in common use:

- Tracking changes using database triggers
- Reading the transaction log as, or shortly after, it is written.

If the data is not in a modern database, CDC becomes a programming challenge.

=== Push versus pull ===
- Push: the source process creates a snapshot of changes within its own process and delivers rows downstream. The downstream process uses the snapshot, creates its own subset and delivers them to the next process.
- Pull: the target that is immediately downstream from the source, prepares a request for data from the source. The downstream target delivers the snapshot to the next target, as in the push model.

=== Alternatives ===
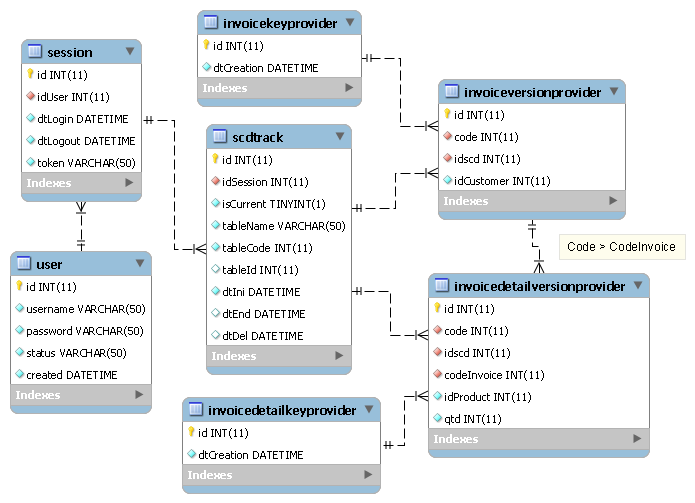
Slowly changing dimension (SCD) model example

Sometimes the slowly changing dimension is used as an alternative method. CDC and SCD are similar in that both methods can detect changes in a data set. The most common forms of SCD are type 1 (overwrite), type 2 (maintain history) or 3 (only previous and current value). SCD 2 can be useful if history is needed in the target system. CDC overwrites in the target system (akin to SCD1), and is ideal when only the changed data needs to arrive at the target, i.e. a delta-driven dataset.

== See also ==
- Referential integrity
- Slowly changing dimension

== See also ==
- Oracle Data Integrator
