= Database dump =

Record of the table structure and/or the data from a database

A database dump contains a record of the table structure and/or the data from a database and is usually in the form of a list of SQL statements ("SQL dump"). A database dump is most often used for backing up a database so that its contents can be restored in the event of data loss. Corrupted databases can often be recovered by analysis of the dump. Database dumps are often published by free content projects, to facilitate reuse, forking, offline use, and long-term digital preservation.

Dumps can be transported into environments with Internet blackouts or otherwise restricted Internet access, as well as facilitate local searching of the database using sophisticated tools such as grep.

== See also ==
- Import and export of data
- Core dump
- Databases
- Database management system
- SQLyog- MySQL GUI tool to generate Database dump
- Data portability
