= Current database =

A current database is a conventional database that stores valid data.

For example, if a user inserts "John Smith" into the Staff table of a current database, this asserts that the fact is valid now and until it is subsequently deleted. By contrast, a temporal database qualifies each row with a valid time stamp, valid time period or valid time interval. For example, we can assert the fact that "John Smith" was a member of staff during the period 1 June 2001 and now. As of 2006, current databases were the most common type of database in use. The concept of now is discussed in Clifford et alia (1997).
