= Wide and narrow data =

Two different methods for presenting tabular data

Wide and narrow are terms used to describe two different presentations for tabular data.

== Terminology ==
The terms used vary by community and software:

- Wide and long: Common in modern data science and time-series analysis (e.g., pandas, R).
- Un-stacked and stacked: Common in statistical software and spreadsheet operations.
- Pivoted and unpivoted: Common in SQL and data preparation tools like Power Query, where "unpivoting" refers to transforming wide data into a long format.
- Wide and narrow: Common in database modeling.

== Wide ==
Wide, or unstacked data is presented with each different data variable in a separate column.

Person	Age	Weight	Height
Bob	32	168	180
Alice	24	150	175
Steve	64	144	165

== Narrow ==
Narrow, stacked, or long data is presented with one column containing all the values and another column listing the context of the value

Person	Variable	Value
Bob	Age	32
Bob	Weight	168
Bob	Height	180
Alice	Age	24
Alice	Weight	150
Alice	Height	175
Steve	Age	64
Steve	Weight	144
Steve	Height	165

This is often easier to implement; addition of a new field does not require any changes to the structure of the table, however it can be harder for people to understand.

== Implementations ==
Many statistical and data processing systems have functions to convert between these two presentations, for instance the R programming language has several packages such as the tidyr package. The pandas package in Python implements this operation as "melt" function which converts a wide table to a narrow one. The process of converting a narrow table to wide table is generally referred to as "pivoting" in the context of data transformations. The "pandas" python package provides a "pivot" method which provides for a narrow to wide transformation.

== See also ==
- Abstract data type
- Pivot table
- Table (information)
- Information graphics
- Row (database)
- Table (database)
- Table (HTML)
