= Natural key =

Type of unique key in a database

A natural key (also known as business key or domain key) is a type of unique key in a database formed of attributes that exist and are used in the external world outside the database (i.e. in the business domain or domain of discourse). In the relational model of data, a natural key is a superkey and is therefore a functional determinant for all attributes in a relation.

A natural key serves two complementary purposes:

- It provides a means of unique identification for data
- It imposes a rule, specifically a uniqueness constraint, to ensure that data remains unique within an information system

The uniqueness constraint assures uniqueness of data within a certain technical context (e.g. a set of values in a table, file or relation variable) by rejecting input of any data that would otherwise violate the constraint. This means that the user can rely on a guaranteed correspondence between facts identified by key values recorded in a system and the external domain of discourse (a single version of the truth according to Kimball).

A natural key differs from a surrogate key which has no meaning outside the database itself and is not based on real-world observation or intended as a statement about the reality being modelled. A natural key therefore provides a certain data quality guarantee whereas a surrogate does not. It is common for elements of data to have several keys, any number of which may be natural or surrogate.

== Advantages ==
The advantages of using a natural key to uniquely identify records in a relation include less disk space usage, the natural key is an attribute that is related to the business or the real world so in most cases, it is already being stored in the relation which saves disk space as compared to creating a new column for storing the surrogate key.

Another advantage of using natural keys is that it simplifies enforcement of data quality, and they are easier to relate to real life while designing the database system. They simplify the quality of data as using a natural key that is unique in the real world ensures that there cannot be multiple records with the same primary key. Comparing the database schema to a real world scenario is a huge part of designing a database schema and when a natural key is being used in the tables of the database, it makes it easy for the database engineer to engineer the database system.

== Disadvantages ==
Usage of natural keys as unique identifiers in a table has one main disadvantage which is the change of business rules or the change of rules of the attribute in the real world. The definition of the structure of the natural key attribute might change in the future.

For example if there is a table storing the information about US citizens, the Social Security Number would act as the natural key, Social Security Number being the natural key might pose a problem in the future if the US government changes the structure of the Social Security Number and increases the number of digits in the SSN due to some reason. In that case, the database administrator will have to change the schema of the table and perhaps also update the records of the table. In other cases, this can prevent improvements of the system altogether due to too extensive effort required for the change, e.g., the inability of the knowledge management software Confluence, to represent multiple pages with the same title.
