= Odaba =

ODABA is a terminology-oriented database management system, which is a conceptual extension of an object-oriented database system, and implements concepts defined in a terminology model. ODABA supports typical standards and technologies for object-oriented databases, but also terminology-oriented database extensions. ODABA also behaves like an object–relational database management system, i.e. data is seen as being stored in a database rather than accessing persistent objects in a programming environment. ODABA supports active data link (ADL) and provides an ADL-based GUI framework.

== Features ==
Database access is supported via an application program interface (API) for C++ or .NET programming languages and via the ODABA Script Interface (OSI). Object Definition Language (ODL) and Object Query Language (OQL) provided with OSI are ODMG 3.0 conform.

Beside standard models (object model, functional model and dynamic model), ODABA supports a documentation model and an administration model. In order to be terminology model compliant, several conceptual extensions are supported as set relations, multilingual attributes, weak-typed collections or hierarchical enumerations (classifications).

ODABA supports semi-automatic conversion from terminology models to object models and schema conversion from object model to relational models (MS SQL Server, MySQL, Oracle) which allows storing or mirroring ODABA data in relational databases or in XML files.
