= OMT =

OMT may refer to:

== Technology ==
- OMT-G, configuration in object-based spatial databases
- Object-modeling technique, language for software modeling and designing
- Object model template, architecture for distributed computer simulation systems
- Open microchip technology, the technology of implanting microchips in animals for research or tracking
- Orthomode transducer, also polarisation duplexer, microwave duct component of the class of microwave circulators

== Health and wellness ==
- Osteopathic manipulative treatment, hands-on application of manipulative techniques on the patient by a Doctor of Osteopathic Medicine
- Ocular tremor, also ocular microtremor, type of eye tremor
- Orofacial Myofunctional Therapy, most commonly used to retrain oral rest posture, swallowing patterns, and speech

== Other ==
- Outright Monetary Transactions, which denotes the European Central Bank's purchases of bonds issued by Eurozone member-states
- O-methyltransferase, type of methyltransferase enzyme transferring a methyl group on a molecule
