= Terminology (disambiguation) =

Terminology is the study of terms and their use.

Terminology may also refer to:

- Terminology, default terminal emulator for Enlightenment window manager
- Terminology science, a branch of linguistics studying special vocabulary

== See also ==
- Terminology planning policy
- Terminology model
- Terminology extraction
