= CODB =

CODB may refer to:

- Component-oriented database
- City of Daytona Beach, Florida, US, website name and short form on forms
