= Conformational dynamics data bank =

Database of protein conformations

Content
- Description: conformational dynamics of proteins and supramolecular protein assemblies.

Contact
- Primary citation: PMID 21051356
- Release date: 2010

Access
- Website: http://www.cdyn.org

The conformational dynamics data bank (CDDB) is a database about conformational dynamics of heavy proteins and protein assemblies. The CDDB is useful when used alongside static structural data to aid research into protein function. It is also helpful in identifying protein assemblies that are essential to cell function.

Analysis is carried out by coarse-grained computation of the structures present in the electron microscopy data bank (EMDB). This analysis shows equilibrium thermal fluctuations and elastic strain energy distributions, which allows for identification of rigid and flexible protein domains. The results also provide information on correlations in molecular motions which can be used to identify molecular regions that are highly coupled dynamically.
