= C Object Processor =

The C Object Processor (COP) was a superset of the C programming language. It was used in the Vbase object-oriented database management system developed by Ontologic, Inc. The data model for Vbase was specified by a Type Definition Language (TDL). COP and TDL were influenced by CLU. By 1989, COP and TDL were replaced by C++ in Ontologic's second generation product, ONTOS. The company was also renamed ONTOS, Inc.
