= MICRO Relational Database Management System =

Computer software

The MICRO Relational Database Management System was the first large-scale set-theoretic database management system to be used in production. Though MICRO was initially considered to be an "Information Management System", it was eventually recognized to provide all the capabilities of an RDBMS. MICRO's major underpinnings and algorithms were based on the Set-Theoretic Data Structure (STDS) model developed by D. L. Childs of the University of Michigan's CONCOMP (Conversational Use of Computers) Project. MICRO featured a natural language interface which allowed non-programmers to use the system.

Implementation of MICRO began in 1970 as part of the Labor Market Information System (LMIS) project at the University of Michigan's Institute of Labor and Industrial Relations (ILIR). Dr. Malcolm S. Cohen was Director of the LMIS Project and was the principal innovator and designer of the original MICRO Retrieval System. Carol Easthope and Jack Guskin were the principal programmers. D.L. Childs, Vice President of Set Theoretic Information Systems (STIS) Corporation, provided continuing guidance in the use of Set-Theoretic Data Structure (STDS) data access software for MICRO. Funding came from the Office of Manpower Administration within the U.S. Department of Labor. MICRO was first used for the study of large social science data bases referred to as micro data; hence the name. Organizations such as the US Department of Labor, the US Environmental Protection Agency, and researchers from the University of Alberta, the University of Michigan, Wayne State University, the University of Newcastle upon Tyne, and Durham University used MICRO to manage very large scale databases until 1998.

MICRO runs under the Michigan Terminal System (MTS), the interactive time-sharing system developed at the University of Michigan that runs on IBM System/360 Model 67, System/370, and compatible mainframe computers. MICRO provides a query language, a database directory, and a data dictionary to create an interface between the user and the very efficient proprietary Set-Theoretic Data Structure (STDS) software developed by the Set-Theoretic Information Systems Corporation (STIS) of Ann Arbor, Michigan. The lower level routines from STIS treat the data bases as sets and perform set operations on them, e.g., union, intersection, restrictions, etc. Although the underlying STDS model is based on set theory, the MICRO user interface is similar to those subsequently used in relational database management systems. MICRO's data representation can be thought of as a matrix or table in which the rows represent different records or "cases", and the columns contain individual data items for each record; however, the actual data representation is in set-theoretic form. In labor market applications the rows typically represent job applicants or employees and columns represent fields such as age, sex, and income or type of industry, number of employees, and payroll.

MICRO permits users with little programming experience to define, enter, interrogate, manipulate, and update collections of data in a relatively unstructured and unconstrained environment. An interactive system, MICRO is powerful in terms of the complexity of requests which can be made by users without prior programming language experience. MICRO includes basic statistical computations such as mean, variance, frequency, median, etc. If more rigorous statistical analysis are desired, the data from a MICRO database can be exported to the Michigan Interactive Data Analysis System (MIDAS), a statistical analysis package available under the Michigan Terminal System.
