= Object Data Management Group =

The Object Data Management Group (ODMG) was conceived in the summer of 1991 at a breakfast with object database vendors that was organized by Rick Cattell of Sun Microsystems. In 1998, the ODMG changed its name from the Object Database Management Group to reflect the expansion of its efforts to include specifications for both object database and object–relational mapping products.

The primary goal of the ODMG was to put forward a set of specifications that allowed a developer to write portable applications for object database and object–relational mapping products. In order to do that, the data schema, programming language bindings, and data manipulation and query languages needed to be portable.

Between 1993 and 2001, the ODMG published five revisions to its specification. The last revision was ODMG version 3.0, after which the group disbanded.

== Major components of the ODMG 3.0 specification ==
- Object Model. This was based on the Object Management Group's Object Model. The OMG core model was designed to be a common denominator for object request brokers, object database systems, object programming languages, etc. The ODMG designed a profile by adding components to the OMG core object model.
- Object Specification Languages. The ODMG Object Definition Language (ODL) was used to define the object types that conform to the ODMG Object Model. The ODMG Object Interchange Format (OIF) was used to dump and load the current state to or from a file or set of files.
- Object Query Language (OQL). The ODMG OQL was a declarative (nonprocedural) language for query and updating. It used SQL as a basis, where possible, though OQL supports more powerful object-oriented capabilities.
- C++ Language Binding. This defined a C++ binding of the ODMG ODL and a C++ Object Manipulation Language (OML). The C++ ODL was expressed as a library that provides classes and functions to implement the concepts defined in the ODMG Object Model. The C++ OML syntax and semantics are those of standard C++ in the context of the standard class library. The C++ binding also provided a mechanism to invoke OQL.
- Smalltalk Language Binding. This defined the mapping between the ODMG ODL and Smalltalk, which was based on the OMG Smalltalk binding for the OMG Interface Definition Language (IDL). The Smalltalk binding also provided a mechanism to invoke OQL.
- Java Language Binding. This defined the binding between the ODMG ODL and the Java programming language as defined by the Java 2 Platform. The Java binding also provided a mechanism to invoke OQL.

== Status ==
ODMG 3.0 was published in book form in 2000. By 2001, most of the major object database and object-relational mapping vendors claimed conformance to the ODMG Java Language Binding. Compliance to the other components of the specification was mixed. In 2001, the ODMG Java Language Binding was submitted to the Java Community Process as a basis for the Java Data Objects specification. The ODMG member companies then decided to concentrate their efforts on the Java Data Objects specification. As a result, the ODMG disbanded in 2001.

In 2004, the Object Management Group (OMG) was granted the right to revise the ODMG 3.0 specification as an OMG specification by the copyright holder, Morgan Kaufmann Publishers. In February 2006, the OMG announced the formation of the Object Database Technology Working Group (ODBT WG) and plans to work on the 4th generation of an object database standard.

== ODMG Compliant DBMS ==
- Orient ODBMS: https://openhub.net/p/orient-odbms
- Objectivity/DB C++, Java and Smalltalk interfaces.
