= Terminology model =

Concept system

A terminology model is a refinement of a concept system. Within a terminology model the concepts (object types) of a specific problem or subject area are defined by subject-matter experts in terms of concept (object type) definitions and definitions of subordinated concepts or characteristics (properties). Besides object types, the terminology model allows defining hierarchical classifications, definitions for object type and property behavior and definition of casual relations.

The terminology model is a means for subject-matter experts to express their knowledge about the subject in subject-specific terms. Since the terminology model is structured rather similar to an object-oriented database schema, is can be transformed without loss of information into an object-oriented database schema. Thus, the terminology model is a method for problem analysis on the one side and a mean of defining database schema on the other side.

Several terminology models have been developed and published in the field of statistics:

- Terminology model for classifications
- Terminology model for statistical variables
- Reference model for statistical metadata

== See also ==
- Terminology-oriented database
