= Terminology-oriented database =

A terminology-oriented database or terminology-oriented database management system is a conceptual extension of an object-oriented database. It implements concepts defined in a terminology model. Compared with object-oriented databases, the terminology-oriented database requires some minor conceptual extensions on the schema level as supporting set relations (super-set, subset, intersection etc.), weak-typed collections or shared inheritance.

The data model of a terminology-oriented database is high-level; the terminology-oriented database provides facilities for transforming a terminology model provided by subject area experts completely into a database schema. The target schema might be the database schema for an object-oriented database as well as a relational database schema, or even an XML schema. Typically, terminology-oriented databases are not bound on a specific database type. Since the information content, which can be stored in object-oriented databases and in relational databases, is identical, data for a terminology-oriented database can be stored theoretically in any type of database as well as in an XML file. Thus, terminology-oriented databases may support several database systems for storing application data. Terminology databases, when these contain terms and vocabularies, these become valuable for ontologies and in turn ontologies can help process associated triples or complex predicates thus going deeper than hierarchies or keys in RDBMS. Semantic mapping can also enhance performance.
