= Multics Relational Data Store =

Relational database for the Multics operating system

The Multics Relational Data Store, or MRDS for short, was the first commercial relational database management system. It was written in PL/1 by Honeywell for the Multics operating system and first sold in June 1976. Unlike the SQL systems that emerged in the late 1970s and early 80s, MRDS used a command language only for basic data manipulation, equivalent to the SELECT or UPDATE statements in SQL. Other operations, like creating a new database or general file management, required the use of a separate command program.
