= David L. Childs =

American computer scientist

- Known for: Modeling computer data as mathematical objects
- Scientific career
- Fields: Computer science
- Institutions: Set Theoretic Information Systems Corporation
- Website: xsp.xegesis.org/Iisprof.pdf

David L. Childs is an American computer scientist noted for his work on his Extended Set Theoretic approach to data base management and cited by Edgar F. Codd in his key paper "A Relational Model of Data for Large Shared Data Banks".

== Biography ==
The late 1960s saw Childs working on the CONCOMP project for Research in Conversational Use of Computers under project director Franklin H. Westervelt.

Childs proposed the Extended Set Theoretic approach to database management in 1968 in his paper Feasibility of a Set-Theoretic Data Structure Based on a Reconstituted Definition of a Relation. The MICRO Relational Database Management System which was implemented in 1970 was based on Childs' Set-Theoretic Data Structure (STDS) work.

In 1970 Codd in his key paper on relational databases, A Relational Model of Data for Large Shared Data Banks, cited one of Childs' 1968 papers as part of the basis for the work.

In 1985 Childs formed Integrated Information Systems with object of focusing on the rapid integration and access of highly distributed disparate data and providing software and services to assist in handling this class of problem.
