= Database audit =

Database auditing involves observing a database to be aware of the actions of database users. Database administrators and consultants often set up auditing for security purposes, for example, to ensure that those without the permission to access information do not access it.
