= Objectivity/DB =

Proprietary object database

Objectivity/DB is a commercial object database produced by Objectivity, Inc. It allows applications to store standard C++, C#, Java, or Python objects persistently, without converting them into the rows and columns used by a relational database management system (RDBMS). Objectivity/DB supports popular object-oriented languages as well as SQL/ODBC and XML. It is compatible with Linux, Macintosh, UNIX and Windows platforms, facilitating interoperability across different languages and hardware environments.

== History ==
Objectivity/DB was first introduced in 1990. The C++ and Java interfaces adhere to the ODMG'93 standard, with subsequent additions of C# and Python interfaces. Objectivity, Inc. ceased in late 2023.

== Architectural features ==
Objectivity/DB operates as a distributed database, providing a unified logical view across a network of databases. It employs a distributed computing model where client applications transparently communicate with simplified servers processes.

It utilizes a distributed storage hierarchy, storing objects in logical clusters called containers within federated databases. Each object is assigned a unique 64-bit Object Identifier (OID) within a massive physical address space spanning millions of Terabytes. Notably, the largest reported deployment at SLAC's BaBar experiment stored over a petabyte of objects.

The distributed architecture of Objectivity/DB has facilitated its adoption in grid computing environments and Service Oriented Architecture (SOA) applications. It holds certification as an IBM Ready for Grid product and supports the J2EE Connector Architecture (JCA) standard making it suitable for deployment in cloud environments.
